= America's Got Talent: The Champions season 1 =

America's Got Talent: The Champions
- Season 1
- Promotional poster for season 1, featuring (L to R) judges Mandel, Mel B, Cowell, and Klum alongside host Crews
- Showrunner: Jason Raff
- Hosted by: Terry Crews
- Judges: Simon Cowell; Heidi Klum; Mel B; Howie Mandel
- Winner: Shin Lim
- Runner-up: Darci Lynne
- No. of episodes: 7

Release
- Original network: NBC
- Original release: January 7 – February 18, 2019

Season chronology
- Next → Season 2

The first season of America's Got Talent: The Champions featured around 50 participants from across the Got Talent franchise, ranging from winners, live round participants – quarter-finalists (where applicable), semi-finalists and finalists – and other notable acts. The judging panel consisted of Simon Cowell, Heidi Klum, Mel B, and Howie Mandel, all of whom judged the previous season of the main series. Terry Crews served as host.

Judges and Presenter for America's Got Talent: The Champions Season 1

Simon Cowell

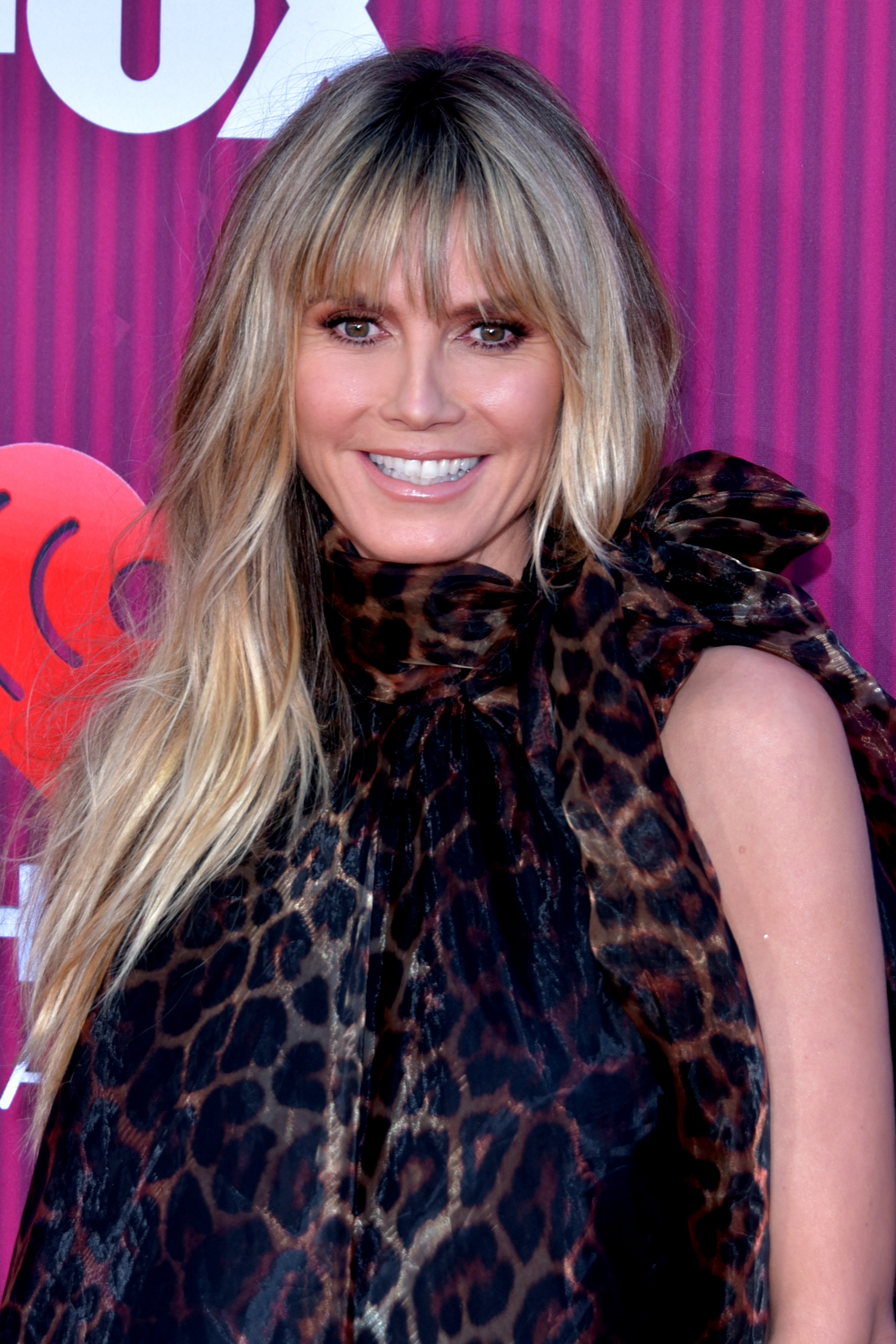
Heidi Klum

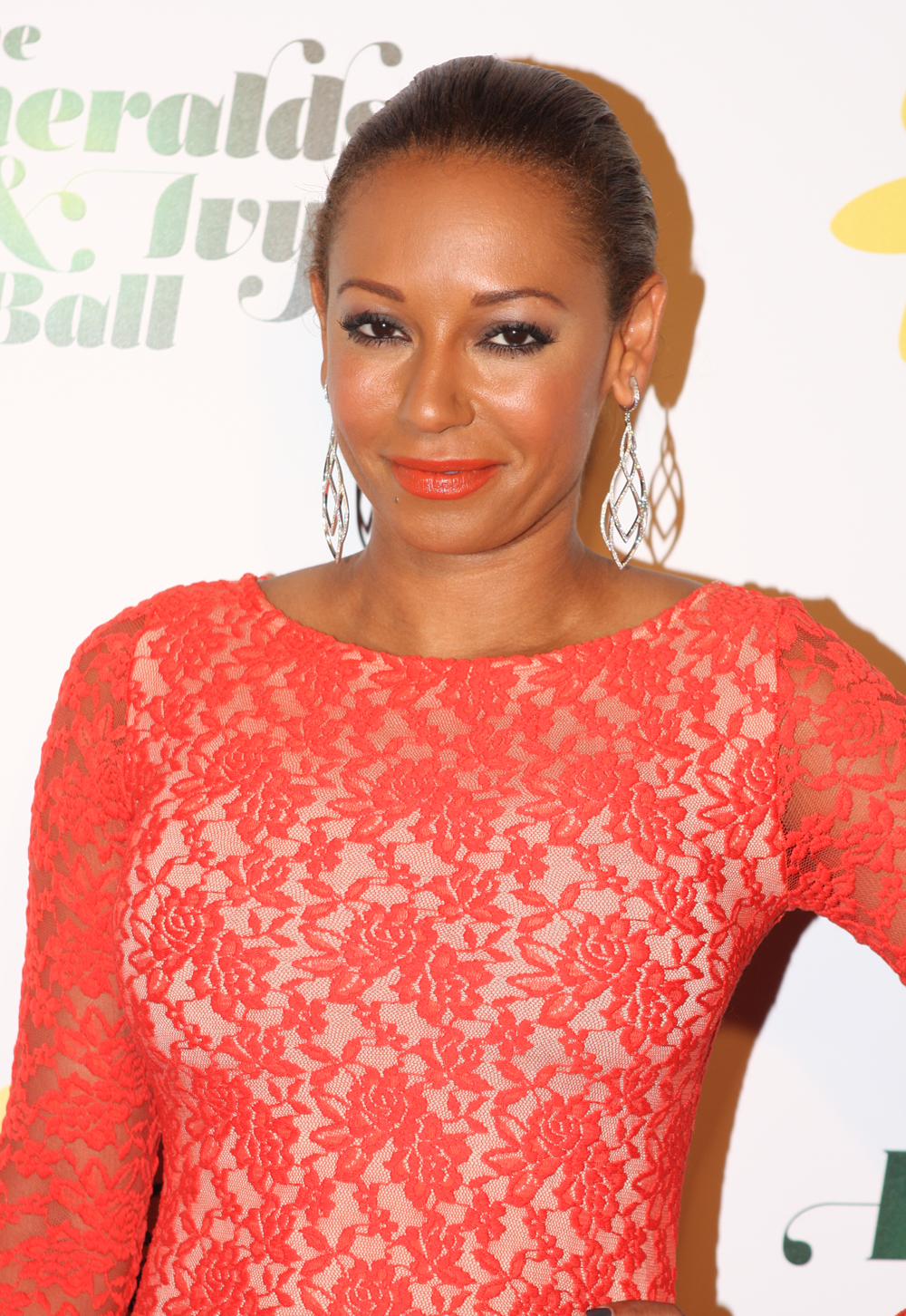
Mel B

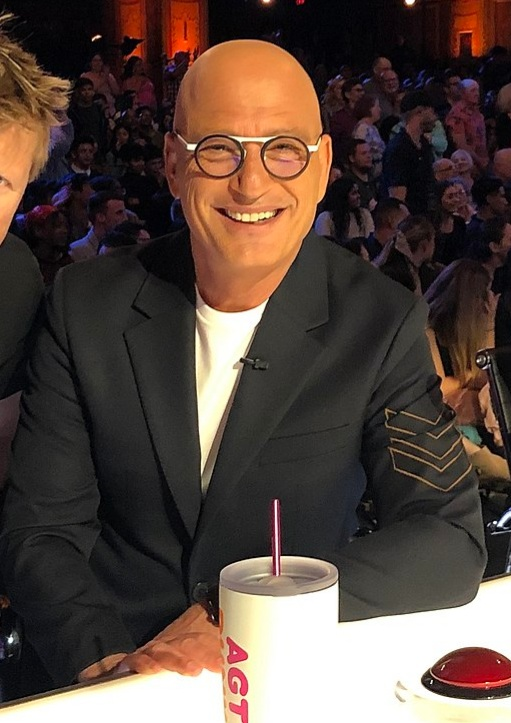
Howie Mandel

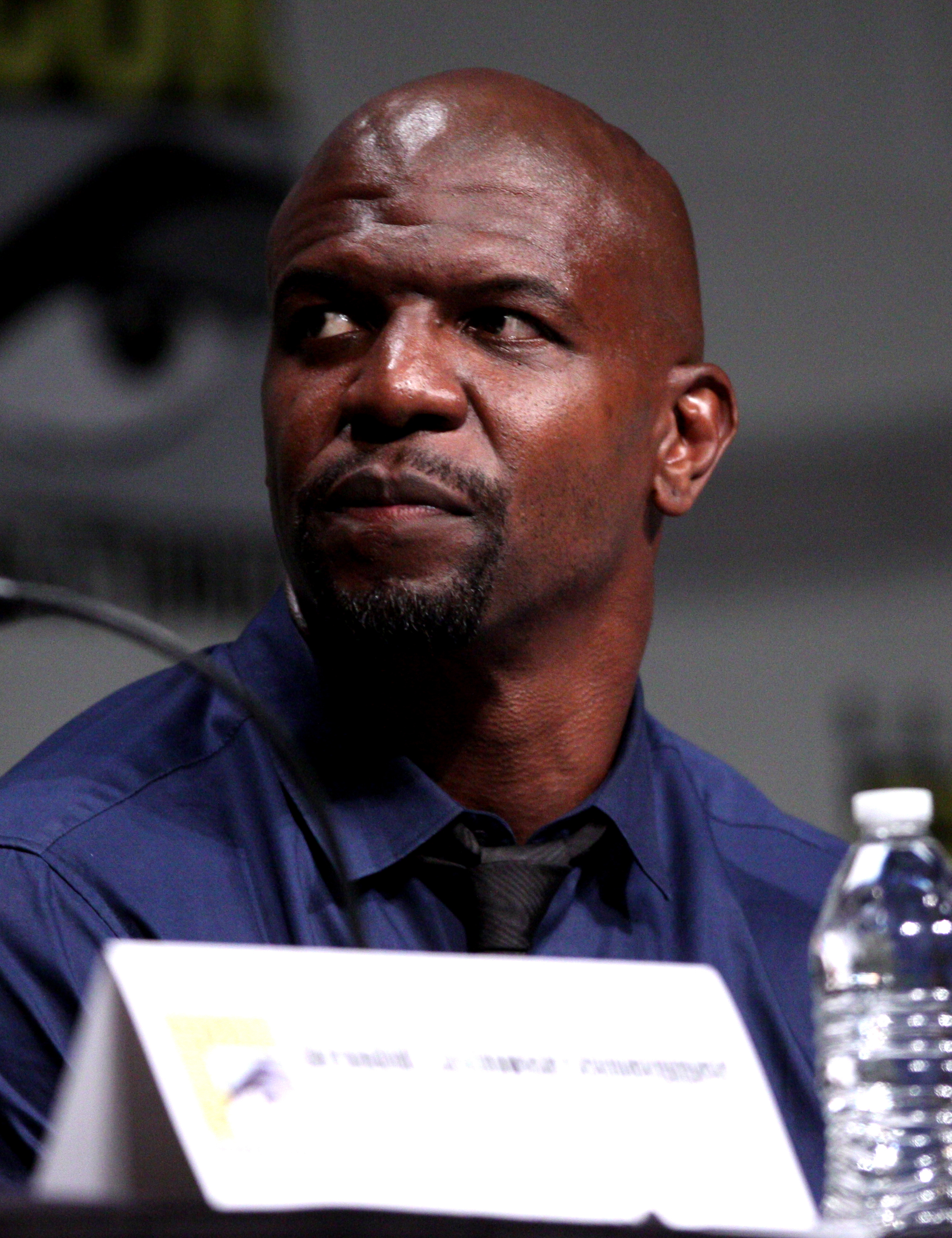
Terry Crews

== Overview ==
The contest's preliminaries rounds that featured around 10 participants who competed to secure a place within the finals. Twelve were chosen, five from Golden Buzzers, five from public votes, and two chosen as Wildcards. The following table lists each participant that took part, their history in the Got Talent franchise – the respective international version and season they appeared in, and the result of their corresponding performance in each – and their overall result in the contest:

Got Talent History Key	AGT — America's Got Talent	AuGT — Australia's Got Talent	BGT — Britain's Got Talent	BeGT — Belgium's Got Talent	ČSMT — Česko Slovensko má talent	DHT — Danmark Har Talent	DS — Das Supertalent
Got Talent History Key	FIT — La France a un incroyable talent	GTE — Got Talent España	HGT — Holland's Got Talent	IGT — Italia's Got Talent	MS — Minuta slavy	SAGT — South Africa's Got Talent	UMT — Ukrayina maye talant

Winner | Runner-up | Third place | Finalist
Eliminated | Golden Buzzer Finalist | Wildcard Finalist

Participant	Act	Got Talent history	Preliminary	Results
Alex Magala	Sword Swallower	AGT: S8 – Quarter-finalist; IGT: S5 – Finalist; MS: S8 – Winner; UMT: S6 – Semi-finalist; FIT: S9 – Participant; BGT: S10 – Finalist; ČSMT: S6 – Semi-finalist	1	Eliminated
Angelica Hale	Singer	AGT: S12 – Runner-up	3	Finalist
Ashleigh & Sully	Dog Act	BGT: S6 – Winner (as Ashleigh and Pudsey)	2	Eliminated
Attraction	Shadow Theatre Group	DS: S6 – Semi-finalist; BGT: S7 – Winner	5	Eliminated
Bianca Ryan	Singer	AGT: S1 – Winner	1	Eliminated
Billy & Emily England	Rollerskating Duo	BGT: S9 – Semi-finalist; AGT: S12 – Semi-finalist	3	Eliminated
Brian Justin Crum	Singer	AGT: S11 – Grand-finalist	4	Finalist
Colin Cloud	Mentalist	BGT: S6 – Participant; AGT: S12 – Semi-finalist	5	Eliminated
Cosentino	Escape Artist & Illusionist	AuGT: S5 – Runner-up	5	Eliminated
Courtney Hadwin	Singer	AGT: S13 – Finalist	2	Eliminated
Cristina Ramos	Opera & Rock Singer	GTE: S1 – Winner	2	Grand-finalist
Darci Lynne	Singing Ventriloquist	AGT: S12 – Winner	2	Runner-up
Darcy Oake	Illusionist	BGT: S8 – Finalist	3	Eliminated
DDF Crew	Jump Rope Dance Crew	HGT: S5 – Winner; BeGT: S4 – Semi-finalist	2	Eliminated
Deadly Games	Knife Throwing Duo	AGT: S11 – Semi-finalist; FIT: S12 – Semi-Finalist	2	Finalist
DJ Arch Jnr	DJ	SAGT: S6 – Winner	3	Eliminated
Drew Lynch	Comedian	AGT: S10 – Runner-up	4	Eliminated
Issy Simpson	Magician	BGT: S11 – Runner-up	4	Eliminated
Jackie Evancho	Opera Singer	AGT: S5 – Runner-up	5	Eliminated
Jon Dorenbos	Magician	AGT: S11 – Third place	3	Finalist
Justice Crew	Dance Troupe	AuGT: S4 – Winner	1	Eliminated
Kechi Okwuchi	Singer	AGT: S12 – Finalist	4	Finalist
Kenichi Ebina	Dancer	AGT: S8 – Winner	4	Eliminated
Kseniya Simonova	Sand Artist	UMT: S1 – Winner	5	Third place
Light Balance	Electronic Dance Troupe	BGT: S8 – Semi-finalist; AGT: S12 – 3rd Place	2	Eliminated
Lost Voice Guy	Comedian	BGT: S12 – Winner	5	Eliminated
Moonlight Brothers	Dance Duo	DHT: S4 – Winner	4	Eliminated
Paul Potts	Opera Singer	BGT: S1 – Winner	3	Finalist
Paul Zerdin	Ventriloquist	AGT: S10 – Winner	4	Eliminated
Piff the Magic Dragon	Comic Magician	AGT: S10 – Finalist	2	Eliminated
Preacher Lawson	Comedian	AGT: S12 – Finalist	1	Grand-finalist
Prince Poppycock	Opera Singer	AGT: S5 – Grand-finalist	3	Eliminated
Ryan Stock & AmberLynn	Sideshow Duo	AGT: S11 – Quarter-finalist	3	Eliminated
Sal Valentinetti	Singer	AGT: S11 – Grand-finalist	5	Eliminated
Samuel J. Comroe	Comedian	AGT: S13 – Grand-finalist	3	Eliminated
Sara & Hero	Dog Act	AGT: S12 – Grand-finalist	1	Eliminated
Shin Lim	Card Magician	AGT: S13 – Winner	5	Winner
Sofie Dossi	Aerialist Contortionist	AGT: S11 – Finalist	1	Eliminated
Sons of Serendip	Band	AGT: S9 – Grand-finalist	5	Eliminated
Susan Boyle	Singer	BGT: S3 – Runner-up	1	Finalist
Tape Face	Mime	AGT: S11 – Finalist	4	Eliminated
Taylor Williamson	Comedian	AGT: S8 – Runner-up	2	Eliminated
The Clairvoyants	Mentalist Duo	AGT: S11 – Runner-up	1	Eliminated
The Professional Regurgitator	Regurgitator	BGT: S4 – Semi-finalist; DS: S4 – Finalist; ČSMT: S2 – Finalist; DS: S5 – Semi-finalist; IGT: S4 – Semi-finalist; FIT: S9 – Grand-finalist; AGT: S10 – Grand-finalist; DS: S12 – Winner	4	Eliminated
The Texas Tenors	Country & Classical Vocal Group	AGT: S4 – Finalist	4	Eliminated
Tokio Myers	Pianist	BGT: S11 – Winner	5	Eliminated
Tom Cotter	Comedian	AGT: S7 – Runner-up	3	Eliminated
Uzeyer Novruzov	Ladder Acrobat	AGT: S10 – Finalist; FIT: S11 – Semi-finalist (as Freeladderman)	1	Eliminated
Vicki Barbolak	Comedian	AGT: S13 – Finalist	1	Eliminated
Viktor Kee	Juggler	AGT: S11 – Finalist	2	Eliminated

=== Preliminaries Summary ===
Golden Buzzer Advancement | Won the Superfan vote | Eliminated – 2nd in Vote
Eliminated – 3rd in Vote | Eliminated | Buzzed out

==== Preliminary 1 (January 7) ====
Participant	Order	Buzzes				Result
Participant	Order	Cowell	Klum	Mel B	Mandel	Result
Bianca Ryan	1					Eliminated (2nd in Superfan Vote)
The Clairvoyants	2					Eliminated
Sara and Hero	3					Eliminated
Uzeyer Novruzov	4					Eliminated
Vicki Barbolak	5					Eliminated
Alex Magala	6					Eliminated
Justice Crew	7					Eliminated
Susan Boyle	8					Advanced
Sofie Dossi	9					Eliminated (3rd in Superfan Vote)
Preacher Lawson	10					Advanced (Won Superfan Vote)

==== Preliminary 2 (January 14) ====
Participant	Order	Buzzes				Result
Participant	Order	Cowell	Klum	Mel B	Mandel	Result
Darci Lynne ^{1}	1					Eliminated (2nd in Superfan Vote)
Ashleigh and Sully	2					Eliminated
Light Balance	3					Eliminated
Taylor Williamson	4					Eliminated
Cristina Ramos	5					Advanced (Won Superfan Vote)
DDF Crew	6					Eliminated
Viktor Kee	7					Eliminated
Courtney Hadwin	8					Eliminated (3rd in Superfan Vote)
Deadly Games	9					Advanced
Piff the Magic Dragon	10					Eliminated

- ^1 Darci Lynne was later made a wildcard act for the Grand-final by the judges.

==== Preliminary 3 (January 21) ====
Participant	Order	Buzzes				Result
Participant	Order	Cowell	Klum	Mel B	Mandel	Result
DJ Arch Jnr	1					Eliminated
Darcy Oake	2					Eliminated
Angelica Hale	3					Advanced
Tom Cotter	4					Eliminated
Prince Poppycock	5					Eliminated
Ryan Stock & AmberLynn	6					Eliminated
Samuel J. Comroe	7					Eliminated
Paul Potts	8					Advanced (Won Superfan Vote)
Jon Dorenbos ^{2}	9					Eliminated (3rd in Superfan Vote)
Billy and Emily England	10					Eliminated (2nd in Superfan Vote)

- ^2 Jon Dorenbos was later made a wildcard act for the Grand-final by the judges.

==== Preliminary 4 (January 28) ====
Participant	Order	Buzzes				Result
Participant	Order	Cowell	Klum	Mel B	Mandel	Result
Issy Simpson	1					Eliminated
The Texas Tenors	2					Eliminated
Drew Lynch	3					Eliminated (Tied 3rd in Superfan Vote)
Paul Zerdin	4					Eliminated (2nd in Superfan Vote)
Moonlight Brothers	5					Eliminated
Tape Face	6					Eliminated (Tied 3rd in Superfan Vote)
Kechi Okwuchi	7					Advanced
The Professional Regurgitator	8					Eliminated
Brian Justin Crum	9					Advanced (Won Superfan Vote)
Kenichi Ebina	10					Eliminated

==== Preliminary 5 (February 4) ====
Participant	Order	Buzzes				Result
Participant	Order	Cowell	Klum	Mel B	Mandel	Result
Attraction	1					Eliminated (2nd in Superfan Vote)
Jackie Evancho	2					Eliminated
Colin Cloud ^{3}	3	^{4}	^{4}	^{4}		Eliminated
Lost Voice Guy	4					Eliminated
Sal Valentinetti	5					Eliminated
Tokio Myers	6					Eliminated
Kseniya Simonova	7					Advanced
Cosentino	8					Eliminated
Sons of Serendip	9					Eliminated (3rd in Superfan Vote)
Shin Lim	10					Advanced (Won Superfan Vote)

- ^3 David Hasselhoff, a former judge of America's Got Talent and Britain's Got Talent, made a special appearance as part of Colin Cloud's performance.
- ^4 Cowell, Klum & Mel B pressed their buzzers as part of Colin Cloud's performance.

=== Finals Summary ===
==== Top 12 Final (February 11) ====
Finalist	Order	Act	Result
Cristina Ramos	1	Opera & Rock Singer	Advanced
Preacher Lawson	2	Comedian	Advanced
Darci Lynne	3	Singing Ventriloquist	Advanced
Deadly Games	4	Knife Throwing Duo	Top 12 Finalist
Kechi Okwuchi	5	Singer	Top 12 Finalist
Brian Justin Crum	6	Singer	Top 12 Finalist
Jon Dorenbos	7	Magician	Top 12 Finalist
Angelica Hale	8	Singer	Top 12 Finalist
Kseniya Simonova	9	Sand Artist	Advanced
Paul Potts	10	Opera Singer	Top 12 Finalist
Shin Lim	11	Card Magician	Advanced
Susan Boyle	12	Singer	Top 12 Finalist

==== Grand-final (February 18) ====
Winner | Runner-up | 3rd place

Guest performers: Tokio Myers & Voices of Hope Children's Choir, The Clairvoyants, Cirque du Soleil, and Jackie Evancho

Grand-finalist	Act	Performed with	Result
Cristina Ramos	Opera & Rock Singer	Brian Justin Crum & Deadly Games	4th
Darci Lynne	Singing Ventriloquist	Rowlf the Dog	2nd
Kseniya Simonova	Sand Artist	N/A	3rd
Preacher Lawson	Comedian	N/A	5th
Shin Lim	Card Magician	Melissa Fumero	1st
