= America's Got Talent: Fantasy League =

American TV talent competition program

- Genre: Reality; Talent contest
- Showrunner: Jason Raff
- Directed by: Russell Norman
- Presented by: Terry Crews
- Judges: Howie Mandel; Heidi Klum; Mel B; Simon Cowell
- Country of origin: United States
- Original language: English
- No. of seasons: 1
- No. of episodes: 8

Production
- Executive producers: Simon Cowell; Jason Raff; Sam Donnelly; Natasha Brugler
- Camera setup: Multi-camera
- Production companies: Fremantle; Syco Entertainment

Original release
- Network: NBC
- Release: January 1 – February 19, 2024

Related
- America's Got Talent; America's Got Talent: All-Stars; America's Got Talent: The Champions; Britain's Got Talent: The Champions

America's Got Talent: Fantasy League (also known as AGT: Fantasy League) is an American reality television and talent competition series that premiered on NBC on January 1, 2024. The "fantasy league" series is a spin-off featuring winners, finalists, fan favorites, and others from previous seasons of America's Got Talent and across the Got Talent franchise, with each judge serving as a mentor for a set of acts. Terry Crews hosts the series, with Simon Cowell, Mel B, Heidi Klum, and Howie Mandel serving as judges.

== Format ==
Judges and Presenter for America's Got Talent: Fantasy League

Simon Cowell

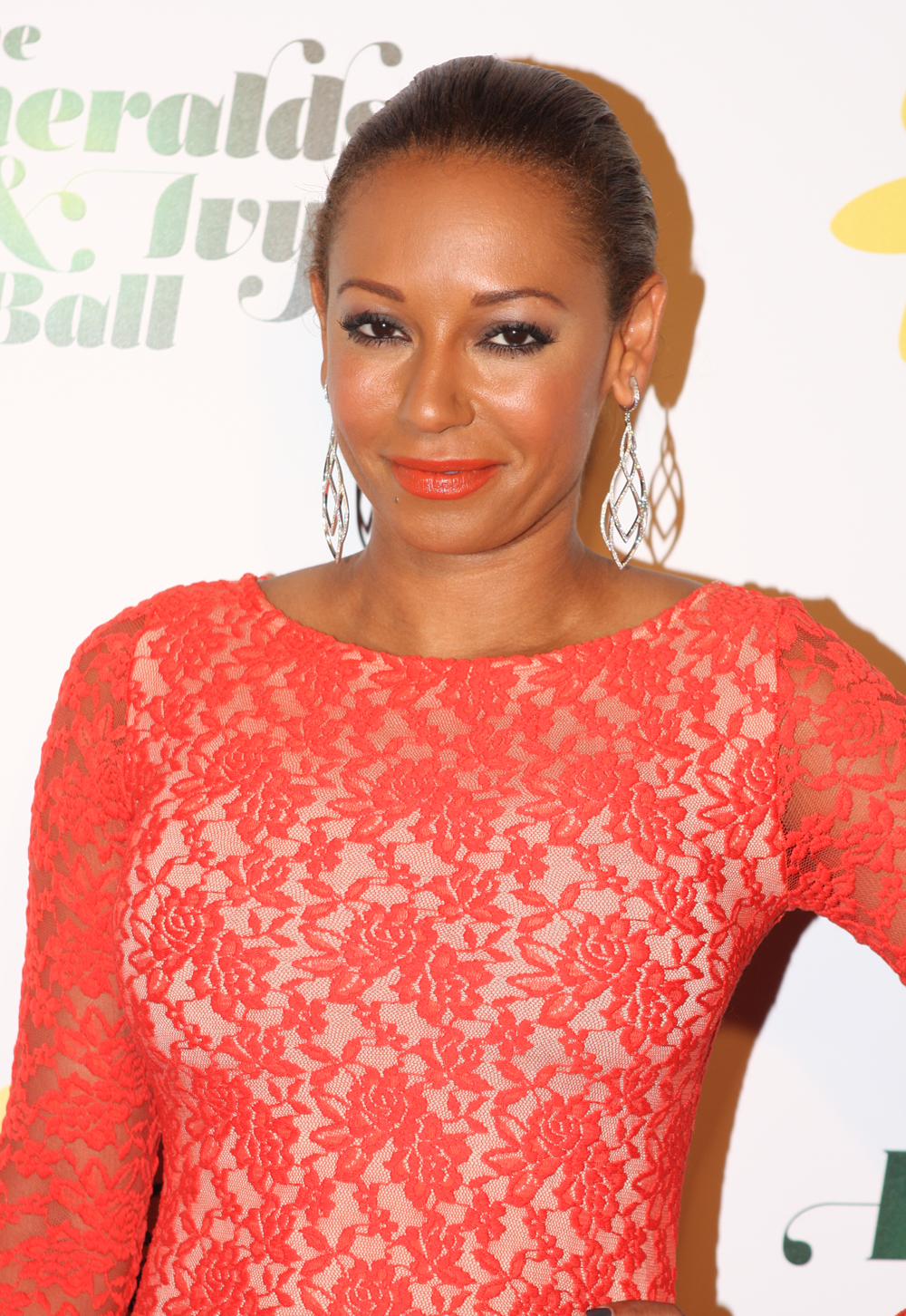
Mel B

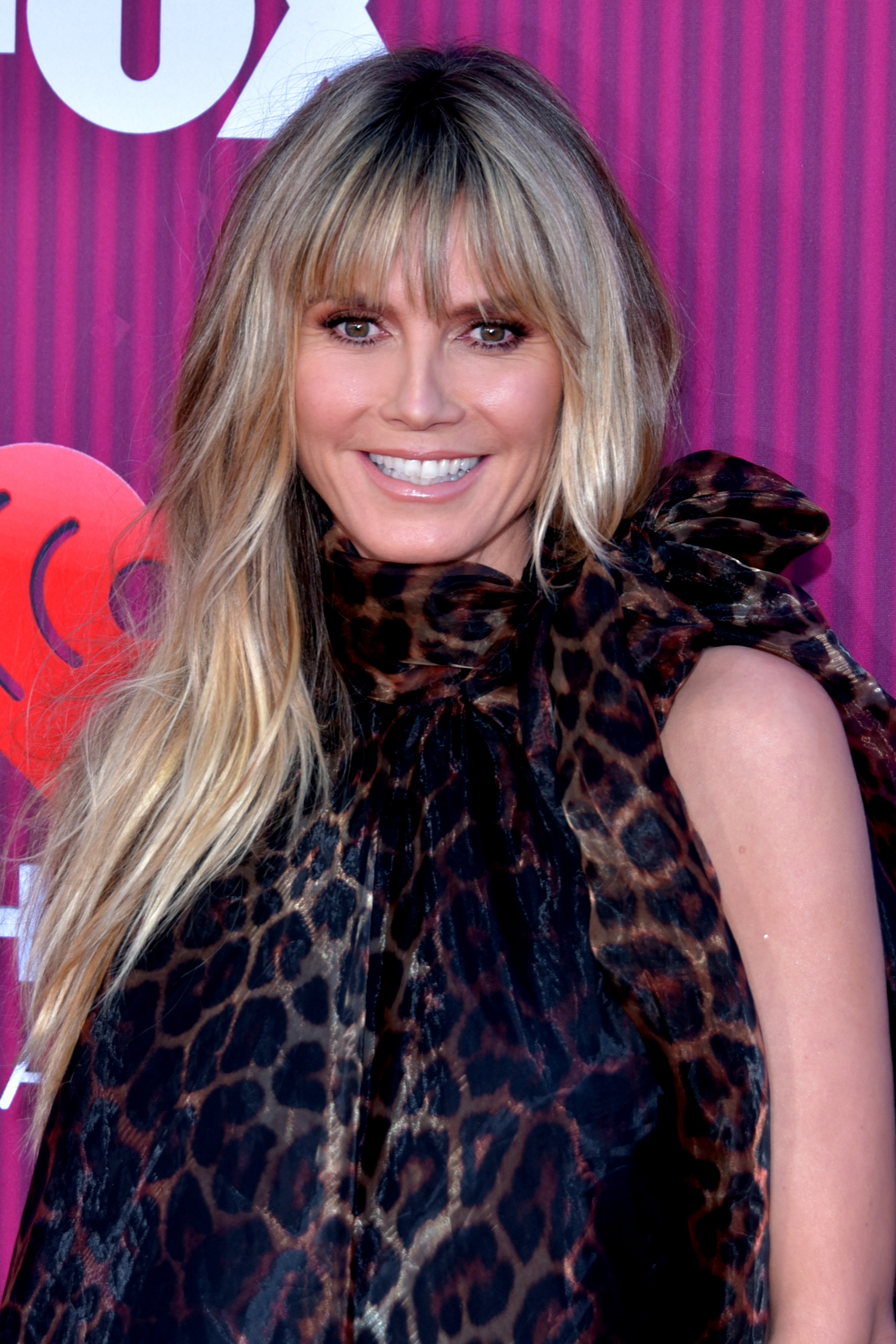
Heidi Klum

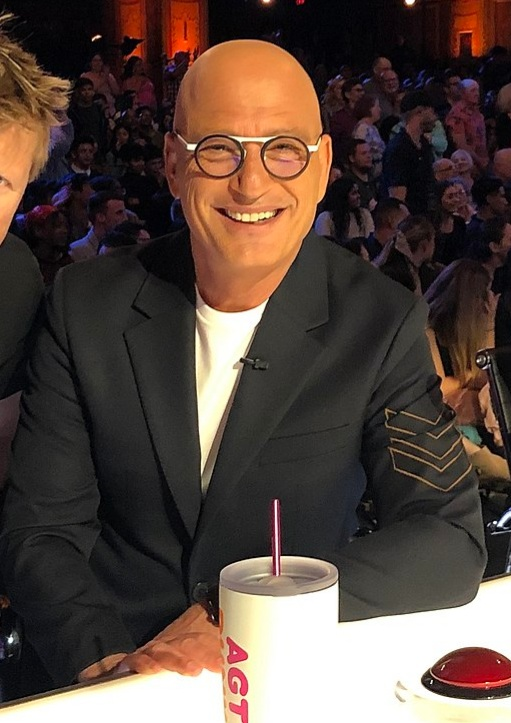
Howie Mandel

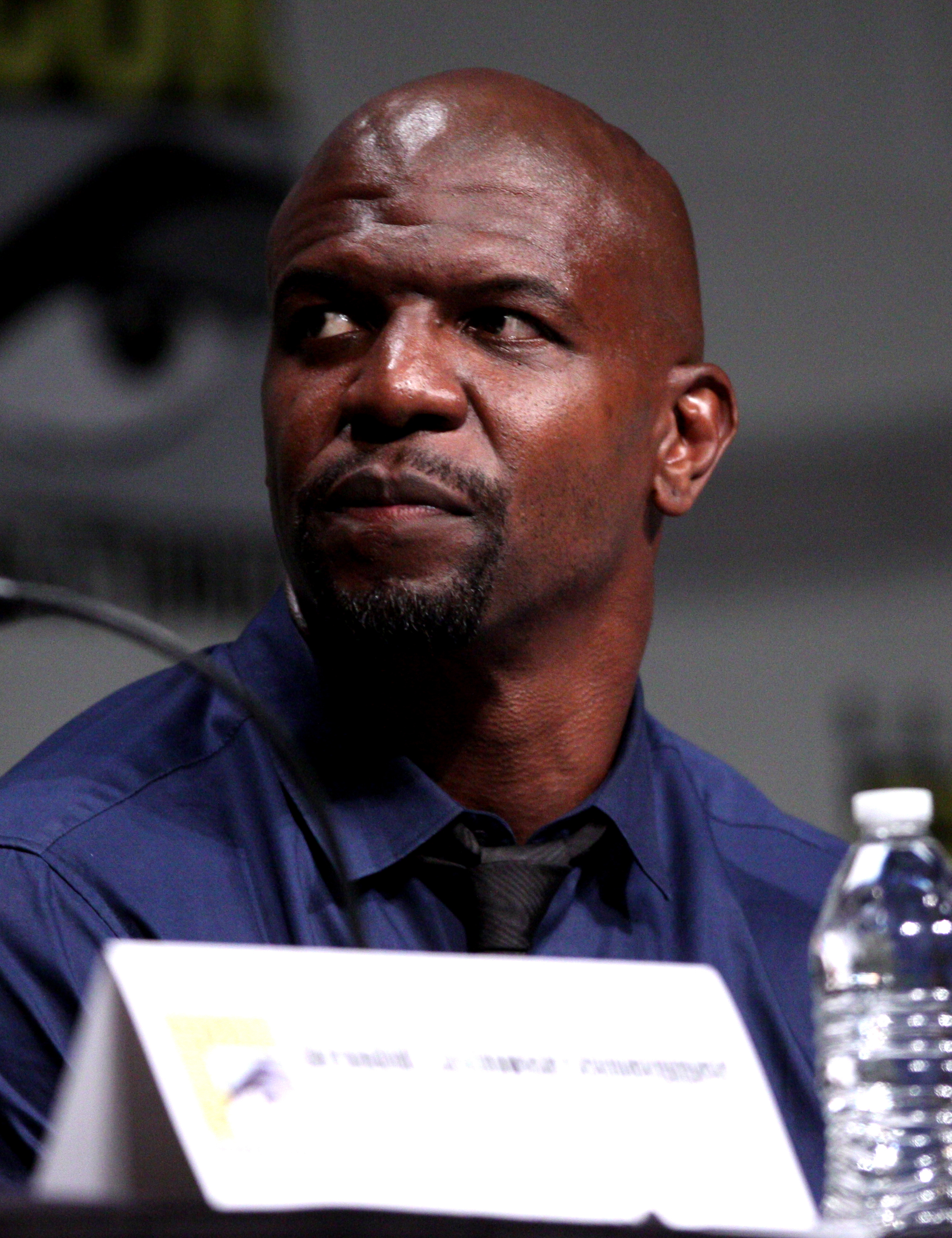
Terry Crews

Similar to America's Got Talent: The Champions and America's Got Talent: All-Stars, the "fantasy league" format includes past winners, finalists, and fan favorites from across previous seasons of the franchise, competing for the Fantasy League title. However, apart from the other spin-offs, Fantasy League allows the judges to have a team of 10 acts that they selected to compete. The judges serve as mentors to their respective acts throughout the show with the goal of each judge having one of their own acts crowned champion. Once all participants in a round have completed their performance, an off-stage vote is conducted by the studio audience, which determines the five participants securing a place in the semi-finals. The golden buzzer takes on a new role in the series: a judge can either use it to advance one of their own acts or steal an act from another judge's team. Each golden buzzer recipient bypasses the semi-finals and goes directly to the finals. In the finale, the winner receives a cash prize of $250,000.

== Production ==
On May 12, 2023, it was announced that an untitled America's Got Talent series was in the works, set for premiere midseason of the 2023–24 television season. On September 21, 2023, the series was officially revealed as AGT: Fantasy League, with judges Simon Cowell, Mel B, Heidi Klum, and Howie Mandel as well as host Terry Crews. On November 15, 2023, it was announced that the series would premiere on January 1, 2024.

== Teams ==
Teams color key
Winner	Stolen in the Semi-finals
Runner-up	Eliminated in the Semi-finals
Third place	Stolen in the Qualifiers
Grand-finalist	Eliminated in the Qualifiers
Eliminated in the Finals

Mentors' teams
Mentor	Top 40 Acts					
Howie Mandel						
Howie Mandel	Ramadhani Brothers	Shadow Ace	Kodi Lee	~~V.Unbeatable~~	Kseniya Simonova	Kristy Sellars
Howie Mandel	Anna DeGuzman	Preacher Lawson	Fritzy Rosmerian	Geneviève Côté	Ichikawa Koikuchi	Drake Milligan
Heidi Klum						
Heidi Klum	V.Unbeatable	Sofie Dossi	~~Aidan Bryant~~	Grace Good	Darci Lynne	Yu Hojin
Heidi Klum	Enkh-Erdene	~~Ramadhani Brothers~~	The Clairvoyants	Piff the Magic Dragon	Hans	
Mel B						
Mel B	Aidan Bryant	Billy and Emily England	Sheldon Riley	Vardanyan Brothers	Ghetto Kids	Travis Japan
Mel B	Brian Justin Crum	Junior New System	MerseyGirls	Jon Dorenbos	Maria Seiren	Tape Face
Simon Cowell						
Simon Cowell	Pack Drumline	SAINTED	Musa Motha	~~Kodi Lee~~	Adrian Stoica & Hurricane	Chapel Hart
Simon Cowell	Loren Allred	~~Billy and Emily England~~	Cillian O'Connor	Wes-P		
Note: Italicized names are acts stolen or saved from a team during the Qualifiers. Bold names are acts stolen or saved from a team during the Semi-finals.

== Overview ==
Got Talent History Key	AGT — America's Got Talent	AGTAS — America's Got Talent: All-Stars	AGTC — America's Got Talent: The Champions	AsGT — Asia's Got Talent	AuGT — Australia's Got Talent
Got Talent History Key	BGT — Britain's Got Talent	BGTC — Britain's Got Talent: The Champions	BGTUM — Britain's Got Talent: The Ultimate Magician	BTT — Balgariya tarsi talant (Bulgaria's Got Talent)	CGT — Canada's Got Talent
Got Talent History Key	CST — Česko Slovensko má talent (Czech Slovak's Got Talent)	EET — Ελλάδα Έχεις Ταλέντο (Greece's Got Talent)	FIT — La France a un incroyable talent (France's Got Talent)	FITBJ — La France a un incroyable talent: La Bataille Du Jury (France's Got Talent: Battle Of The Judges)	GGT — ნიჭიერი (Georgia's Got Talent)
Got Talent History Key	GTE — Got Talent España	GTEAS — Got Talent España: All Stars	IGT — Indonesia's Got Talent	ItGT — Italia's Got Talent	JGT — Japan's Got Talent
Got Talent History Key	MGT — Авьяаслаг Монголчууд (Mongolia's Got Talent)	MS — Минута славы (Russia's Got Talent)	PGT — Pilipinas Got Talent (Philippines's Got Talent)	RT — Românii au talent (Romania's Got Talent)	SIT — Slovenija ima talent (Slovenia's Got Talent)

Winner | Runner-up | Third place | Finalist | Semi-finalist
Eliminated | Golden Buzzer – Qualifiers | Golden Buzzer – Semi-finals

Participant	Act	Mentor	Got Talent history	Qualifier	Results
Adrian Stoica & Hurricane	Dog Act	Simon Cowell	AGT: S18 – Winner; ItGT: S8 – Semi-finalist; RT: S12 – Participant	2	Semi-finalist
Aidan Bryant	Aerialist	Mel B	AGT: S16 – Runner-up; AGTAS: – Winner; GTEAS: S1 – Finalist	4	Finalist
Anna DeGuzman	Magician	Howie Mandel	AuGT: Season 10 – Participant; AGT: S18 – Runner Up	4	Semi-finalist
Billy and Emily England	Rollerskating Duo	Mel B	BGT: S9 – Semifinalist; AGT: S12 – Semi-finalist; AGTC: S1 – Participant; BGTC: S1 – Participant	1	Finalist
Brian Justin Crum	Singer	Mel B	AGT: S11 – Fourth place; AGTC: S1 – Finalist	4	Eliminated
Chapel Hart	Vocal Trio	Simon Cowell	AGT: S17 – Fifth place	3	Semi-finalist
Cillian O'Connor	Magician	Simon Cowell	BGT: S16 – Third place	4	Eliminated
Darci Lynne	Singing Ventriloquist	Heidi Klum	AGT: S12 – Winner; AGTC: S1 – Runner-up	4	Semi-finalist
Drake Milligan	Singer	Howie Mandel	AGT: S17 – Third place	2	Eliminated
Enkh-Erdene	Singer	Heidi Klum	MGT: S2 – Winner	3	Semi-finalist
Fritzy Rosmerian	Magician	Howie Mandel	IGT: S3 – Fifth place	3	Eliminated
Geneviève Côté	Vocalist	Howie Mandel	CGT: S3 – Finalist	3	Eliminated
Ghetto Kids	Dance Group	Mel B	BGT: S16 – Finalist	4	Semi-finalist
Grace Good	Aerialist & Hula Hoop Artist	Heidi Klum	AGT: S18 – Semi-finalist	2	Semi-finalist
Hans	Singer, Accordionist & Dancer	Heidi Klum	AGT: S13 – Quarter-finalist; AGTC: S2 – Finalist	1	Eliminated
Ichikawa Koikuchi	Flatulist	Howie Mandel	AsGT: S3, Participant; BGT: S16, Semi-finalist, FIT: S17, Participant; GTE: S9, Participant	3	Eliminated
Jon Dorenbos	Magician	Mel B	AGT: S11 – Third place; AGTC: S1 – Finalist	1	Eliminated
Junior New System	Dance Group	Mel B	AsGT: S1 – Finalist; AGT: S13 – Semi-finalist	3	Eliminated
Kodi Lee	Singer & Pianist	Howie Mandel	AGT: S14 – Winner; AGTAS: – Finalist	1	Finalist
Kristy Sellars	Multimedia Pole Dancer	Howie Mandel	AuGT: S9 – Winner; AGT: S17 – Runner-up	1	Semi-finalist
Kseniya Simonova	Sand Artist	Howie Mandel	UMT: S1 – Winner; AGTC: S1 – Third place; BGTC: S1 – Third place	1	Semi-finalist
Loren Allred	Singer	Simon Cowell	BGT: S15 – Finalist	3	Semi-finalist
Maria Seiren	Singer	Mel B	JGT: S1 – Winner	1	Eliminated
MerseyGirls	Dance Group	Mel B	BGT: S11 – Finalist; BGTC: Finalist	2	Eliminated
Musa Motha	Contemporary Dancer	Simon Cowell	BGT: S16 – Finalist	4	Grand-finalist
Pack Drumline	Percussion Group	Simon Cowell	AGT: S17 – Semi-finalist	3	Runner-up
Piff the Magic Dragon	Comic Magician	Heidi Klum	AGT: S10 – Finalist; AGTC: S1 – Participant	2	Eliminated
Preacher Lawson	Comedian	Howie Mandel	AGT: S12 – Finalist; AGTC: S1 – Fifth place; BGTC: S1 -Finalist	2	Semi-finalist
Ramadhani Brothers	Balancing Duo	Howie Mandel	AuGT: S10 – Finalist; AGT: S18 – Fifth place; CST: Season 11 – Participant; FIT: Season 17 – Finalist; GTEAS: Finalist; RT: Season 13 – Semi-finalist	2	Winner
SAINTED	Choir	Simon Cowell	AGT: S18 – Semi-finalist	4	Grand-finalist
Shadow Ace	Shadow Artist	Howie Mandel	AsGT: S3 – Finalist; AGT: S18 – Semi-finalist; PGT: S5 – Semi-finalist	1	Finalist
Sheldon Riley	Singer	Mel B	AGT: S15 – Quarter-finalist	2	Semi-finalist
Sofie Dossi	Contortionist	Heidi Klum	AGT: S11 – Finalist; AGTC: S1 – Participant	3	Finalist
Tape Face	Mime	Mel B	AGT: S11 – Finalist; AGTC: S1 – Participant; BGTC: S1 – Participant; FITBJ: Participant; GTEAS: S1 – Participant	1	Eliminated
The Clairvoyants	Mentalist Duo	Heidi Klum	AGT: S11 – Runner-up; AGTC: S1 – Participant; BGTUM: S1 – Participant	4	Eliminated
Travis Japan	J-Pop Band	Mel B	AGT: S17 – Semifinalist	4	Eliminated
V.Unbeatable	Acrobatics Dance Group	Heidi Klum	AGT: S14 – Fourth place; AGTC: S2 – Winner	1	Third place
Vardanyan Brothers	Balancing Duo	Mel B	BGT: S13 – Semifinalist; GTEAS: S1 – Runner-up; MS: S9 – Winner	2	Semi-finalist
Wes-P	Novelty Act	Simon Cowell	GeGT: S7 – Semi-finalist; BGT: S12 – Semi-finalist; AGT: S13 – Participant; FGT: S13 – Finalist; AiGT: S3 – Participant; RT: S10 – Participant; GrGT: S7 – Participant; BTT: S8 – Participant; AuGT: S10 – Participant; GTE: S9 – Semi-finalist	2	Eliminated
Yu Hojin	Magician	Heidi Klum	AGT: S17 – Finalist	3	Semi-finalist

=== Qualifiers summary ===
Golden Buzzer Advancement | Advanced to Semi-finals | Eliminated | Buzzed out

==== Qualifier 1 (January 1) ====
Participant	Team	Order	Buzzes				Result
Participant	Team	Order	Cowell	Mel B	Klum	Mandel	Result
Kristy Sellars	Howie Mandel	1					Advanced (Won Audience Vote)
Jon Dorenbos	Mel B	2					Eliminated
Hans	Heidi Klum	3					Eliminated
Kseniya Simonova	Howie Mandel	4					Advanced (Won Audience Vote)
V.Unbeatable	Howie Mandel	5					Advanced (Won Audience Vote)
Maria Seiren	Mel B	6					Eliminated
Billy and Emily England	Simon Cowell	7					Advanced to Finals (Stolen by Mel B)
Tape Face	Mel B	8					Eliminated
Shadow Ace	Howie Mandel	9					Advanced (Won Audience Vote)
Kodi Lee	Simon Cowell	10					Advanced (Won Audience Vote)

==== Qualifier 2 (January 8) ====
Participant	Team	Order	Buzzes				Result
Participant	Team	Order	Cowell	Mel B	Klum	Mandel	Result
Adrian Stoica & Hurricane	Simon Cowell	1					Advanced (Won Audience Vote)
Piff the Magic Dragon	Heidi Klum	2					Eliminated
MerseyGirls	Mel B	3					Eliminated
Drake Milligan	Howie Mandel	4					Eliminated
Ramadhani Brothers	Heidi Klum	5					Advanced to Finals (Stolen by Howie Mandel)
Preacher Lawson	Howie Mandel	6					Advanced (Won Audience Vote)
Grace Good	Heidi Klum	7					Advanced (Won Audience Vote)
Vardanyan Brothers	Mel B	8					Advanced (Won Audience Vote)
Wes-P	Simon Cowell	9					Eliminated
Sheldon Riley	Mel B	10					Advanced (Won Audience Vote)

==== Qualifier 3 (January 15) ====
Participant	Team	Order	Buzzes				Result
Participant	Team	Order	Cowell	Mel B	Klum	Mandel	Result
Junior New System	Mel B	1					Eliminated
Chapel Hart	Simon Cowell	2					Advanced (Won Audience Vote)
Fritzy Rosmerian	Howie Mandel	3					Eliminated
Pack Drumline	Simon Cowell	4					Advanced (Won Audience Vote)
Enkh-Erdene	Heidi Klum	5					Advanced (Won Audience Vote)
Sofie Dossi	Heidi Klum	6					Advanced to Finals
Geneviève Côté	Howie Mandel	7					Eliminated
Yu Hojin	Heidi Klum	8					Advanced (Won Audience Vote)
Ichikawa Koikuchi	Howie Mandel	9					Eliminated
Loren Allred	Simon Cowell	10					Advanced (Won Audience Vote)

==== Qualifier 4 (January 22) ====
Participant	Team	Order	Buzzes				Result
Participant	Team	Order	Cowell	Mel B	Klum	Mandel	Result
Aidan Bryant	Heidi Klum	1					Advanced (Won Audience Vote)
Travis Japan	Mel B	2					Eliminated
Cillian O'Connor	Simon Cowell	3					Eliminated
Brian Justin Crum	Mel B	4					Eliminated
Ghetto Kids	Mel B	5					Advanced (Won Audience Vote)
Anna DeGuzman	Howie Mandel	6					Advanced (Won Audience Vote)
SAINTED	Simon Cowell	7					Advanced to Finals
Darci Lynne	Heidi Klum	8					Advanced (Won Audience Vote)
The Clairvoyants	Heidi Klum	9					Eliminated
Musa Motha (Note: Because Musa Motha's paperwork to allow himself clearance into America was incomplete, he had to do his act remotely.)	Simon Cowell	10					Advanced (Won Audience Vote)

=== Semi-finals summary ===
Golden Buzzer Advancement | Advanced to Finals | Eliminated (2nd in Audience Vote) | Eliminated (3rd in Audience Vote) | Eliminated | Buzzed out

==== Semi-finals 1 (January 29) ====
Participant	Team	Order	Buzzes				Result
Participant	Team	Order	Cowell	Mel B	Klum	Mandel	Result
Kristy Sellars	Howie Mandel	1					Eliminated
Loren Allred	Simon Cowell	2					Eliminated (2nd in Audience Vote)
Aidan Bryant	Heidi Klum	3					Advanced to Finals (Stolen by Mel B)
Enkh-Erdene	Heidi Klum	4					Eliminated
Anna DeGuzman	Howie Mandel	5					Eliminated
Vardanyan Brothers	Mel B	6					Eliminated (3rd in Audience Vote)
Ghetto Kids	Mel B	7					Eliminated
Kodi Lee	Simon Cowell	8					Advanced to Finals (Stolen by Howie Mandel)
Preacher Lawson	Howie Mandel	9					Eliminated
Pack Drumline	Simon Cowell	10					Advanced (Won Audience Vote)

==== Semi-finals 2 (February 5) ====
Participant	Team	Order	Buzzes				Result
Participant	Team	Order	Cowell	Mel B	Klum	Mandel	Result
Grace Good	Heidi Klum	1					Eliminated
Kseniya Simonova	Howie Mandel	2					Eliminated (3rd in Audience Vote)
Darci Lynne	Heidi Klum	3					Eliminated
Musa Motha	Simon Cowell	4					Advanced to Finals
Sheldon Riley	Mel B	5					Eliminated
Adrian Stoica & Hurricane	Simon Cowell	6					Eliminated (2nd in Audience Vote)
Yu Hojin	Heidi Klum	7					Eliminated
Chapel Hart	Simon Cowell	8					Eliminated
V.Unbeatable	Howie Mandel	9					Advanced to Finals (Stolen by Heidi Klum)
Shadow Ace	Howie Mandel	10					Advanced (Won Audience Vote)

=== Finals (February 12) ===
Winner | Runner-up | 3rd place | Top 5

Guest performers: Chapel Hart and Drake Milligan

Finalist	Team	Order	Performed with (2nd Performance)	Result (February 19)
Pack Drumline	Simon Cowell	1	Sheila E.^{1}	2nd
Sofie Dossi	Heidi Klum	2	Loren Allred and Brian Justin Crum^{2}	Finalist
Kodi Lee	Howie Mandel	3	Stephen Sanchez	Finalist
V.Unbeatable	Heidi Klum	4	Sheila E.^{1}	3rd
Ramadhani Brothers	Howie Mandel	5	Loren Allred and Brian Justin Crum^{2}	1st
Musa Motha	Simon Cowell	6	Calum Scott	Grand-finalist
Aidan Bryant	Mel B	7	Loren Allred and Brian Justin Crum^{2}	Finalist
Shadow Ace	Howie Mandel	8	David Taylor	Finalist
Billy and Emily England	Mel B	9	Loren Allred and Brian Justin Crum^{2}	Finalist
SAINTED	Simon Cowell	10	Robin S.	Grand-finalist

- ^1 Pack Drumline and V.Unbeatable conducted a joint routine for their second performance, and thus shared the same guest performer.
- ^2 Sofie Dossi, Ramadhani Brothers, Aidan Bryant, and Billy and Emily England conducted a joint routine for their second performance, and thus shared the same guest performers.

== Ratings ==
Viewership and ratings per episode of America's Got Talent: Fantasy League
No.	Title	Air date	Rating (18–49)	Viewers (millions)	Ref.
1	"Qualifiers 1"	January 1, 2024	0.3	3.07	
2	"Qualifiers 2"	January 8, 2024	0.3	3.85	
3	"Qualifiers 3"	January 15, 2024	0.3	3.07	
4	"Qualifiers 4"	January 22, 2024	0.4	4.33	
5	"Semi-Finals 1"	January 29, 2024	0.4	4.12	
6	"Semi-Finals 2"	February 5, 2024	0.4	4.33	
7	"Final Performances"	February 12, 2024	0.4	4.08	
8	"Final Results"	February 19, 2024	0.4	4.07	
