= Sofie Dossi =

American YouTuber and contortionist (born 2001)

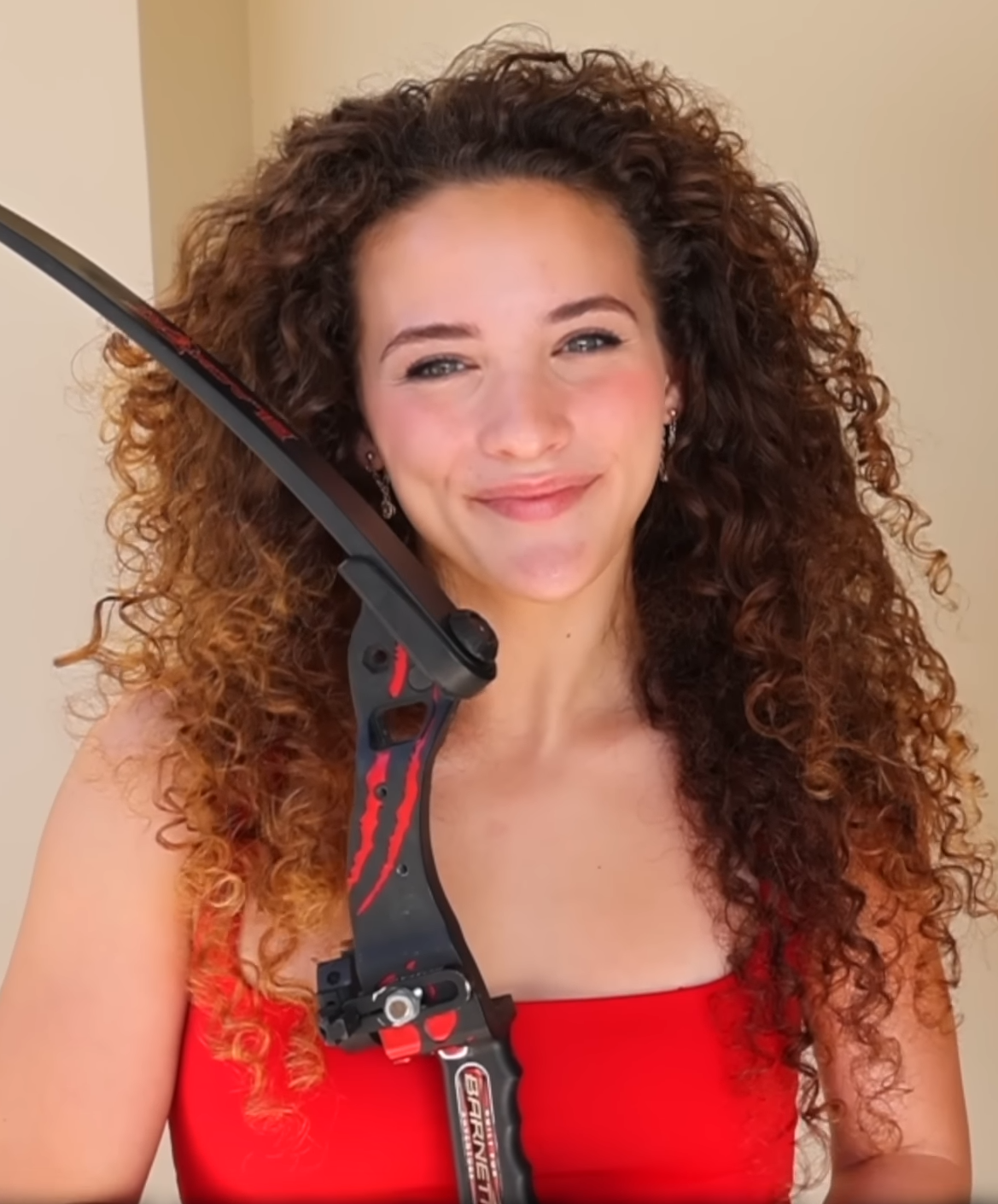
- Dossi in May 2023
- Born: Sofie Clarice Dossi; June 21, 2001 (age 25); Cypress, California, U.S.
- Occupations: Actress; contortionist; aerialist; dancer; internet personality; singer
- Relatives: Zak Dossi (brother)

YouTube information
- Channel: Sofie Dossi
- Years active: 2016–present
- Genre: Challenge
- Subscribers: 10.1 million
- Views: 2.2 billion
- Last updated: 23 July 2026
- Website: sofiedossi.com

Sofie Clarice Dossi (born June 21, 2001) is an American contortionist, YouTuber, singer, actress, aerialist, and internet personality. In 2016, she rose to fame on the eleventh season of America's Got Talent. After placing highly in the show, she pivoted her attention to creating content on YouTube. As of July 2026, her YouTube channel has 10.1 million subscribers and 2.2 billion views.

== Early life ==
Dossi was born on 21 June 2001 in Cypress, California to Abir and Mike Dossi. She is of Arab descent on her mother's side and Italian on her father's side. Her father is originally from Brooklyn, New York. Despite frequent online speculation, Dossi does not lack a spine.

As a child, Dossi took gymnastics and dance lessons and learned classical piano. When she found that she was able to bend her body similarly to a contortionist in a Cirque du Soleil video, she began at age 12 to teach herself contortion. She emulated poses that she found on YouTube and invented new ones. She soon performed at gatherings for friends and family and eventually was hired for larger events. Her family supported her career: she was homeschooled by her mother while her father designed her contortionist props and roadying. Her older brother, Zak, produces and appears in her YouTube videos.

== Career ==
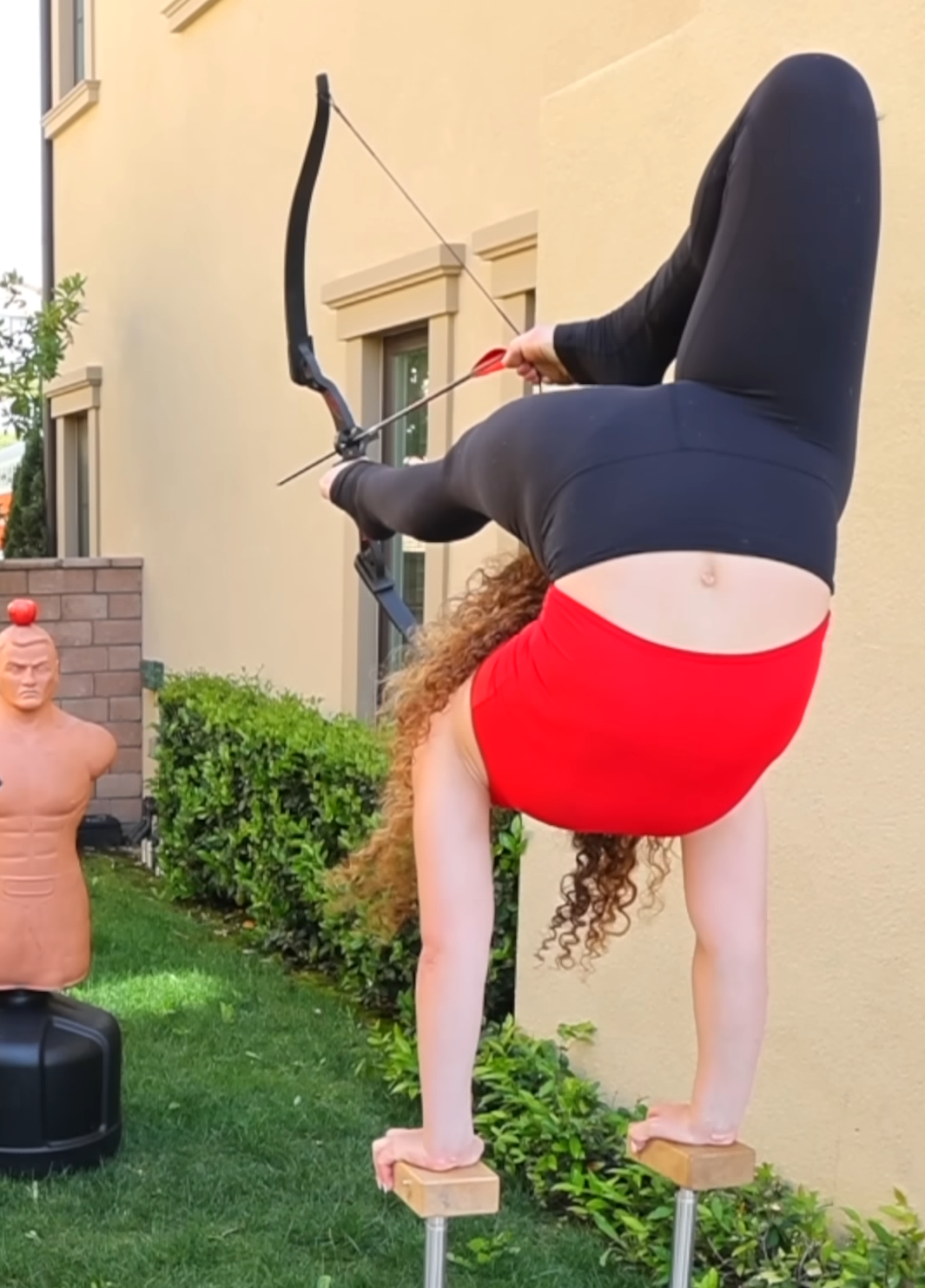
Dossi in 2023, shooting a bow and arrow with her feet in a Stokes Twins video

=== America's Got Talent ===
In 2016, America's Got Talent featured Dossi, then 14, on the show's 11th season, where she performed various feats of flexibility, strength, and dexterity. Her first performance included shooting a bow and arrow with her feet while doing a handstand. After another performance that featured an aerial hoop routine and shooting a flaming arrow from a bow with her feet, guest judge Reba McEntire awarded her the "Golden Buzzer" during the Judge Cuts. In the season finals, she did another routine with handstand tricks and an aerial hoop but did not make the cut for the top five.

She returned to the series in 2019 for the first season of America's Got Talent: The Champions. She did an aerial act in the first episode and finished in third place.

Sofie Dossi appeared in season 14 where she collaborated with singer Bianca Ryan and violinist Brian King Joseph during the first quarterfinals of the season where she did her aerial performance in the background.

In season 18, Dossi reunited with Reba McEntire for a special performance during the final result show. As McEntire sang "Can't Even Get the Blues", Dossi did her usual contortion, hand-balancing, and aerial performances.

In 2024, Dossi competed on America's Got Talent: Fantasy League. In the preliminary rounds, she received the "Golden Buzzer" from her mentor Heidi Klum which sent her directly to the finals. During the finals, she did a new type of balancing act involving hand stands on a rotating wheel called the Wheel of Death. In the results show, she partook in the opening joint performance doing her contortion, hand-standing, and aerial performance with the latter having her collaborate with Aidan Bryant. She made the finals, but did not make the Top 5.

Later in 2024, Dossi did a guest performance on the season 19 of America's Got Talent where she did her aerial, contortion, and hand-standing performances while Sara James sang "Sunshine State of Mind" during the semi-finals result show.

=== YouTube ===
Dossi uploaded the first video to her YouTube channel in late 2016 and continues to post weekly. As of 2026, her channel has accumulated over 10 million subscribers and over 2 billion views. For her work on YouTube, she has been nominated for several Streamy Awards.

=== Acting ===
In acting, Dossi had cameos on Disney Channel's Bizaardvark and K.C. Undercover and starred on the Brat TV show Boss Cheer (2018–2019).

=== Music ===
Dossi ventured into pop music with the release of her debut single, "Bunny", on August 19, 2022. She co-wrote this breakup song with her brother Zak who directed the music video.

== Filmography ==
=== Television ===
Year	Title	Role	Notes
2016	America's Got Talent	Herself/Contestant	Season 11 finalist
2016	K.C. Undercover	Contortionist	Episode: "Tightrope of Doom"
2016	Bizaardvark	Herself	Episode: "First Day of School"
2018–2019	Boss Cheer	Dani	Main role
2019	America's Got Talent: The Champions (Season 1)	Herself/Contestant	Eliminated in Episode 1
2019	America's Got Talent	Herself/Guest performer	First quarterfinals result show; season 14
2023	America's Got Talent	Herself/Guest performer	Qualifiers No. 5 result show; season 18
2024	America's Got Talent: Fantasy League	Herself/Contestant	Finalist
2024	America's Got Talent	Herself/Guest performer	Semi-finals result show; Season 19
2025	America's Got Talent	Herself	Episode: "AGT 20th Birthday Party"
2026	Hollywood Arts	Charli	Episode: "Fake It 'Till Ya Make It"
