= Top-rated United States television programs of 2018–19 =

This table displays the top-rated primetime television series of the 2018–19 season, as measured by Nielsen Media Research.

Rank	Program	Network	Rating
1	Sunday Night Football	NBC	10.9
2	The Big Bang Theory	CBS	10.6
3	NCIS	CBS	9.6
4	Thursday Night Football	FOX	8.7
4	Young Sheldon	CBS	8.7
6	This Is Us	NBC	8.5
7	Blue Bloods	CBS	7.9
7	FBI	CBS	7.9
9	The Good Doctor	ABC	7.4
9	Manifest	NBC	7.4
11	Chicago Fire	NBC	7.2
11	America's Got Talent: The Champions	NBC	7.2
13	Chicago Med	NBC	7.0
13	Bull	CBS	7.0
15	Chicago P.D.	NBC	6.9
15	New Amsterdam	NBC	6.9
17	NCIS: New Orleans	CBS	6.8
18	60 Minutes	CBS	6.7
19	The Voice	NBC	6.6
20	Grey's Anatomy	ABC	6.5
21	Mom	CBS	6.4
22	The Voice: Tuesday	NBC	6.2
22	Hawaii Five-0	CBS	6.2
22	NCIS: Los Angeles	CBS	6.2
25	The Masked Singer	FOX	6.0
26	9-1-1	FOX	5.9
27	The Conners	ABC	5.8
27	God Friended Me	CBS	5.8
29	Survivor	CBS	5.5
29	Dancing with the Stars	ABC	5.5
