= Ryan Stock =

Canadian stuntman

Ryan Stock is a Canadian-based TV stunt man from Beaumont, Alberta who has a show on the Discovery Channel called "Guinea Pig". Stock and his fiancée Amber Lynn Walker travel around Canada and the United States and perform stunts involving electrical shocks, automobile crashes and intentional poisoning. The Guinea Pig Show is no longer in production but may still air in some countries.

Stock became fascinated with magic at an early age and quickly developed his skills as a magician. He soon moved on from simple tricks to performing feats such as fire-eating and fire-breathing. Stock is also the creator and originator of several sideshow stunts performed around the world.

Stock is a sleight of hand artist, showing many of his tricks and illusions along the tour.

He currently holds 5 Guinness World Records.

Stock pulled a 1696 kg 2002 Audi Quattro 6.38m in 20.53 seconds, while having a sword inserted into his esophagus. Two chains were attached between the vehicle's chassis and the sword's hilt. Stock currently holds the world record for "Heaviest Vehicle pull by a sword swallower" as of November 26, 2008, as verified by Guinness World Records.

He holds the record for "The heaviest vehicle pulled using a hook through the nasal cavity and out of the mouth", The automobile weighed 725.0 kg (1598.35 lb), and Stock's attempt at the record was televised on the 'Lo Show dei Record' in Rome, Italy, on 21 March 2012.

He previously held the record for "Most drink can tops torn off with the teeth". Stock broke the record on the March third broadcast of "Guinness World Records Gone Wild", tearing through eleven drink cans in just under the sixty second mark. He was compared to "A Beaver with a taste for aluminum" by the show's hosts. This record was beat on June 22, 2020 by professional MMA fighter Chuck "The Energiza" Mady on the Podcast 2 Dudes & a Mike. Chuck was able to tear through 24 cans in 60 seconds.

In 2014 Stock broke two world records in Edmonton, Alberta Canada. He now holds the record for "most blowtorches extinguished on the tongue in one minute." The previous record was 27, Stock extinguished 40. He also holds the record for "The heaviest weight lifted by hooks in the forearms." and lifted two cement blocks weighing 70 lbs (31.75 kg).

== America's Got Talent ==
In 2016, Ryan Stock and Amber Lynn auditioned for the eleventh season of the popular NBC reality competition, America's Got Talent where they advanced to the quarterfinal round.

He later appeared on the 2019 AGT "Champions."
