= Brian Justin Crum =

- Born: May 28, 1988 (age 38); San Diego, California
- Occupations: Singer; actor
- Musical career
- Instrument: Vocals
- Website: brianjustincrum.com

Brian Justin Crum (born May 28, 1988) is an American singer and actor from San Diego, California. In 2016, he came to national attention competing on the eleventh season of the NBC TV competition America's Got Talent, taking fourth place.

== Early life and stage career ==
Brian Justin Crum was born in San Diego, California, United States, and attended the San Diego School of Creative and Performing Arts. Crum always had a love for music, and decided to take it to the stage.

At the age of seventeen, Crum left San Diego to become a part of the popular broadway musical Wicked. He later moved to New York City and joined the cast of the musical comedy Altar Boyz and Grease. Crum also dreamed of becoming a part of the Next to Normal musical; that came true when he became a standby for Gabe and Henry, characters of the play. Crum has starred in several regional productions such as Tarzan, Jesus Christ Superstar and Snapshots. He soon met his mentor Stephen Schwartz, and the two performed alongside each other throughout the country. Brian played the character of "Daniel" in the episode "Possessed" in Season 12 of Law & Order: SVU which aired on January 5, 2011.

Crum toured with The Addams Family, portraying Lucas Beineke and most frequently as Galileo Figaro in Queen's rock theatrical We Will Rock You. He sang with Brian May and Roger Taylor, original members of the band. He won a few Best Actor in Musical Awards for his performance and garnered reviews that considered him as "a Triumph." But besides his acting career, Crum is now pursuing a new career in Pop music, currently in Los Angeles, California.

=== America's Got Talent ===
For the June 28, 2016, final broadcast during the eleventh season of NBC's America's Got Talent. Crum continued into the cuts and performed Radiohead's "Creep". Crum received enough votes from the public and automatically advanced into the quarterfinals. Going into the quarterfinals, Crum performed Phil Collins' In the Air Tonight. Crum received enough votes from the public once again and advanced to the semi-finals, along with fellow act Grace VanderWaal. In the semi-finals, Crum performed Tears For Fears' "Everybody Wants to Rule the World". Mandel, Klum, Mel and Cowell gave Crum a standing ovation and he received enough votes to be sent into the finals.

For his final performance, Crum sang Michael Jackson's "Man in the Mirror". At the end of the broadcast, Crum placed fourth in the competition overall, with VanderWaal declared as the winner.

=== Post-Got Talent: 2016–present ===
Following his time on America's Got Talent, Crum and Mary Lambert performed as guest vocalists on Superfruit's cover of Katy Perry's "Rise".

He released a cover of Robyn's "Show Me Love" on December 10, 2016, through Prop D Recordings. The song reached the top ten on Billboard's Dance Club Songs chart, and peaked at No. 33 on the magazine's Dance/Electronic Songs chart.

He also made an appearance on America's Got Talent's Christmas special alongside previous Got Talent acts, singing "Santa Claus Is Coming to Town". He has continued to perform live, travelling across the United States to perform at various events.

In 2019, he was a competitor on America's Got Talent: The Champions. On the January 28, 2019, episode, he performed a cover of Elton John's "Your Song" and advanced to the finals. He did not finish in the top five.

The day after the America's Got Talent: The Champions finale, Crum released his new single "Circles".

He sang the National Anthem at the San Diego Padres opening day game, March 28, 2019.

He released a new music video "I & U" on June 20, 2019.

In 2021, he appeared in a Chicago production of Children of Eden at the Arcada Theatre.

In 2024, Crum was a contestant on America's Got Talent: Fantasy League. He was selected to participate on Mel B's team, but was eliminated in the preliminary round.

In 2025, he portrayed Annas in Jesus Christ Superstar at Hollywood Bowl.

== Personal life ==
Crum lived with his aunt and uncle in Oregon. He also has two sisters.

Crum came out as gay during elementary school and was bullied by his classmates. With help from his mother, he later gained confidence in exploring a career as a singer.

== Discography ==
=== Singles ===
- "Wild Side" (2017)
