= Jon Dorenbos =

American football player and magician (born 1980)

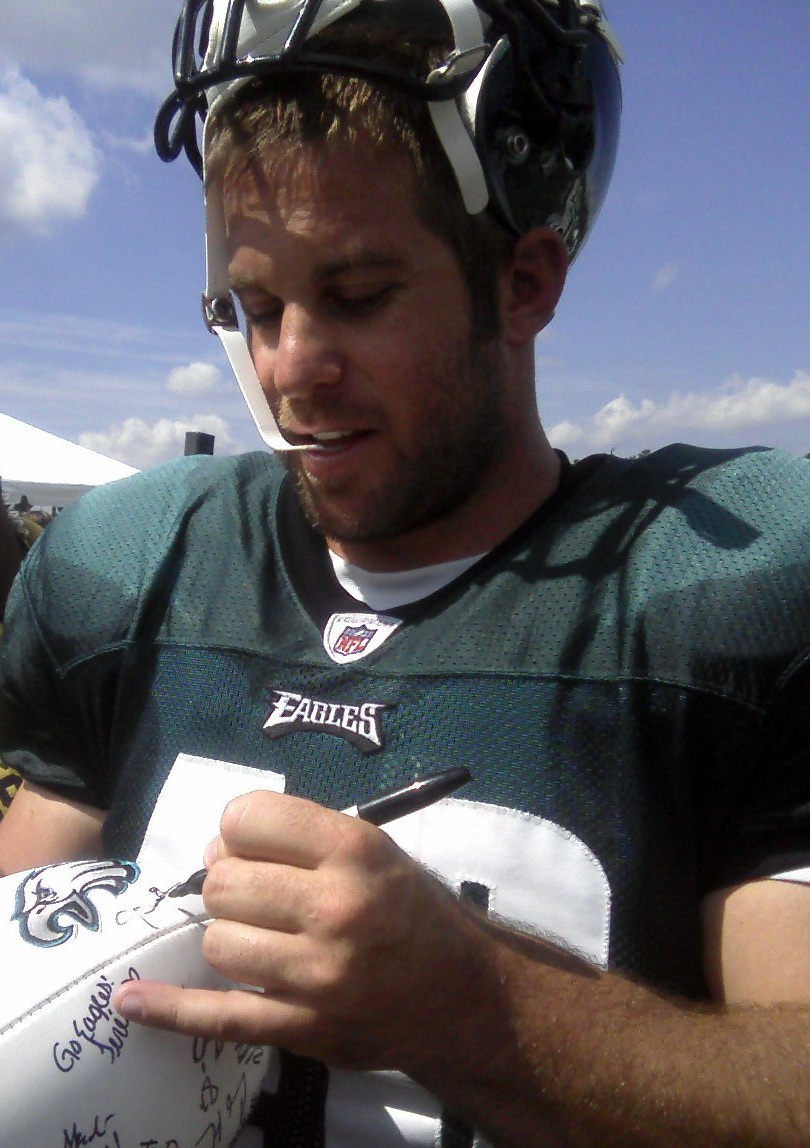
- Dorenbos with the Philadelphia Eagles in 2011

No. 54, 57, 56, 46
- Position: Long snapper

Personal information
- Born: July 21, 1980 (age 46); Humble, Texas, U.S.
- Listed height: 6 ft 0 in (1.83 m)
- Listed weight: 250 lb (113 kg)

Career information
- High school: Pacifica (Garden Grove, California)
- College: UTEP
- NFL draft: 2003: undrafted

Career history
- Buffalo Bills (2003–2004); Tennessee Titans (2005–2006); Philadelphia Eagles (2006–2016); New Orleans Saints (2017)*
- * Offseason or practice squad member only

Awards and highlights
- 2× Pro Bowl (2009, 2014)

Career NFL statistics
- Games played: 201
- Total tackles: 35
- Stats at Pro Football Reference

Jonathan Paul Dorenbos (/ˈdɔːrnbəs/ DORN-boss; born July 21, 1980) is an American former professional football player and magician who was a long snapper in the National Football League (NFL), earning two Pro Bowl selections.

Dorenbos played college football for the UTEP Miners and was signed by the Buffalo Bills as an undrafted free agent in 2003. He also played for the Tennessee Titans and the Philadelphia Eagles, with whom he played 11 seasons and played in 162 consecutive games. After getting traded to the New Orleans Saints in the 2017 preseason, it was discovered Dorenbos had an aortic aneurysm that required immediate surgery and ended his career. The Eagles went on to win Super Bowl LII that season, and it was announced Dorenbos would get an honorary Super Bowl ring.

Dorenbos has a parallel career as a professional magician. He was a finalist on season 11 of the television program America's Got Talent, performing his magic acts. He finished in third place for the season.

== Early life ==
Dorenbos was born in Humble, Texas and grew up in Woodinville, Washington. On August 2, 1992, when he was 12, his mother, Kathy, was killed by his father, Alan, a software specialist. His father was charged with and convicted of second-degree murder, and sentenced to 13 years and eight months in prison. Dorenbos was sent to a foster home. After a legal battle, he was adopted by his aunt and uncle, Susan and Steve Hindman. To ease his mind, Dorenbos turned to performing magic. Dorenbos had a brief reunion with his estranged father in 2019, and said that he has forgiven him for murdering his mother.

Dorenbos attended Pacifica High School in Garden Grove, California, where he was a letterman in football, basketball, hockey and baseball. He earned all-league honors in football and baseball. He made the dean's list and was an honor-roll student in high school. Dorenbos originally attended Golden West College in Huntington Beach, California. During his freshman year, his best friend who was attending University of Texas at El Paso (UTEP), Paul Tessier, called to ask if he would like to be the long snapper for the UTEP Miners football team. At the time, Dorenbos was not the long snapper at Golden West; he played linebacker and fullback. He took some video footage from high school, added footage of the Golden West long snapper, and sent it to the coaches at UTEP. He was eventually recruited and became the long snapper for UTEP in 23 games over three seasons. He averaged almost 10 tackles each year at UTEP on punt coverage. Dorenbos earned a business degree from UTEP, with emphasis in economics, finance and marketing.

== Football career ==
=== Predraft ===
At UTEP's Pro Day workout, which six teams attended, Dorenbos averaged 0.62 seconds in snapping the ball to the punter. One snap was timed at 0.59 seconds. A good time in the NFL is considered between 0.70 seconds and 0.75 seconds. Then-St. Louis Rams special teams coach Bobby April said of his workout, "Even on tape it's clear the guy is amazing. He's the best I've seen this year. And he might be the best in a lot of years, maybe among the top guys I've ever seen...But I'll tell you, Dorenbos is something else, he really is, man." Dorenbos was personally interviewed by only six teams.

=== Buffalo Bills ===
After college, Dorenbos was signed as a long snapper by the Buffalo Bills as an undrafted free agent following the 2003 NFL draft. He was one of only two undrafted free agents to make the team in 2003. He played in his first NFL game on September 7, 2003, against the New England Patriots. He played in all 16 games for the Bills in 2003. In 2004, he led the league in tackles at his position. He played in the first 13 games of the 2004 season before damaging knee ligaments and being placed on the injured reserve list, ending his season. After training camp in 2005, Dorenbos was waived on September 6 during final roster cuts.

=== Tennessee Titans ===
Dorenbos was signed by the Tennessee Titans on October 26, 2005, the same day he worked out for the team. He played in the last nine games of the 2005 season. He was scheduled to become a restricted free agent in free agency in 2006, but the Titans decided not to offer him a tender. He became an unrestricted free agent on March 3. He was not signed for training camp in 2006, but was re-signed on October 13 by the Titans for an October 15 game against the Washington Redskins. He was released on October 25.

=== Philadelphia Eagles ===
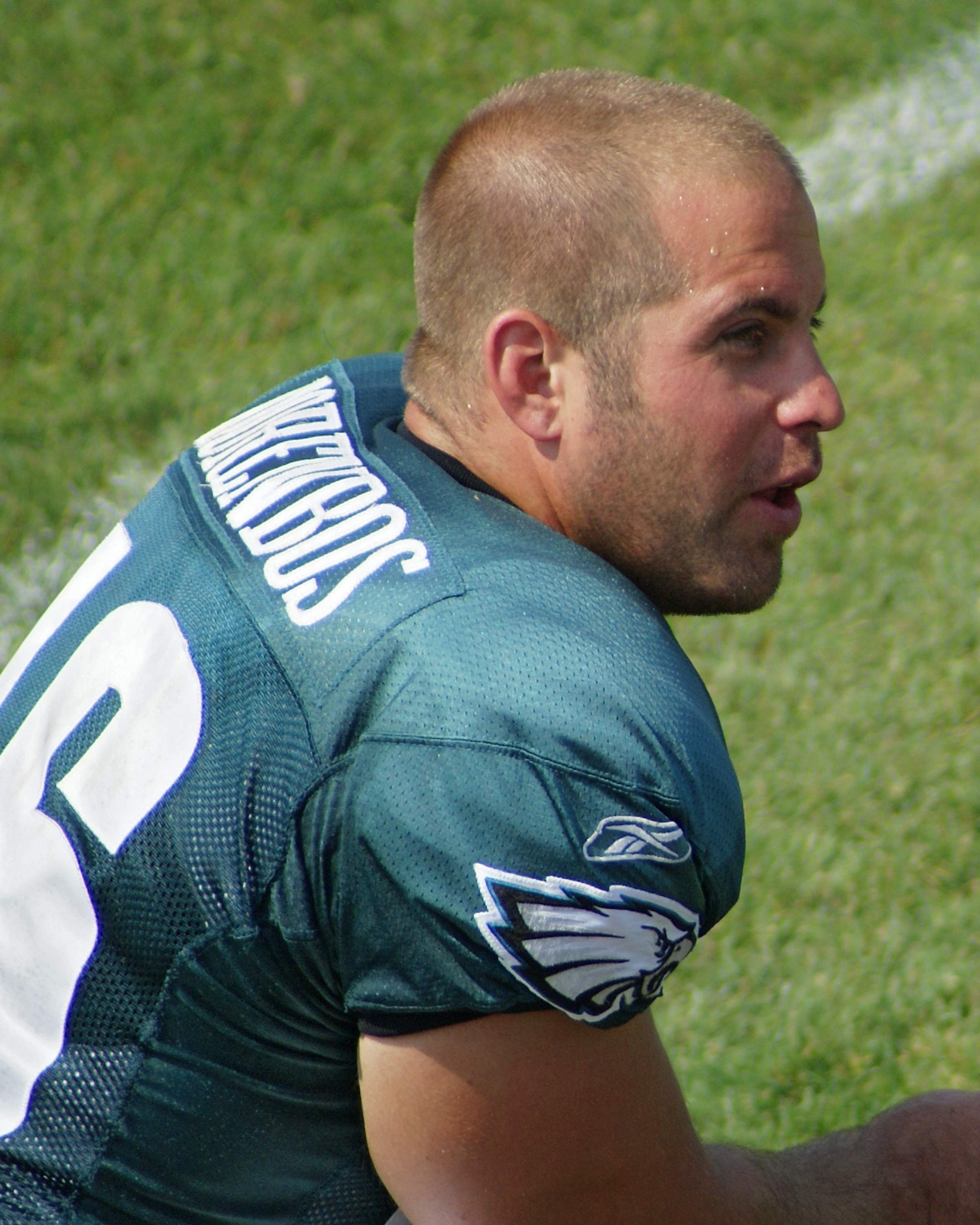
Dorenbos with the Eagles in 2008

Dorenbos was signed to a two-year contract by the Philadelphia Eagles on November 29, 2006, after Mike Bartrum suffered a career-ending neck injury. He played in the last seven games of the 2006 season, including 2 postseason games. He made two special team tackles in 2006. In 2007, he played in all 16 games for the Eagles, and on December 29, 2007, he signed a five-year contract extension that kept him under contract through the 2012 season. He made six total special team tackles in 2007. In 2008, he played in all 16 games for the second-consecutive season. He made five special team tackles in 2008. Dorenbos arrived late to training camp in 2009 after he caught shingles and could not get on an airplane to fly to Lehigh Valley, Pennsylvania, where Eagles training camp was held. He played in all 16 games in 2009, and made four special team tackles.

On January 20, 2010, Dorenbos was named to the NFC's Pro Bowl team. On March 11, 2013, he re-signed with the Eagles. On January 16, 2015, Dorenbos was named to his second Pro Bowl team. Following the releases of veterans Trent Cole and Todd Herremans in the 2015 offseason, Dorenbos became the Eagles' longest tenured player.

On November 18, 2016, Dorenbos signed a three-year, $3.395 million contract extension with the Eagles through 2019. He was placed on injured reserve on December 12, 2016, following surgery for an injured wrist.

=== New Orleans Saints and retirement ===
On August 28, 2017, the Eagles traded Dorenbos to the New Orleans Saints in exchange for a 2019 seventh-round draft pick. On September 7, it was revealed that Dorenbos was diagnosed with aortic aneurysm, which required immediate heart surgery. He was placed on the non-football illness list by the Saints the same day, and released with an injury settlement on September 9 before retiring. The Eagles also returned the draft pick to the Saints.

On February 4, 2018, the Eagles won Super Bowl LII; Eagles owner Jeffrey Lurie promised after the game that Dorenbos would receive a Super Bowl ring alongside the rest of the organization. Dorenbos was presented with his Super Bowl ring on June 21, 2018.

== Magic career ==
Dorenbos is a professional magician, who has performed in Las Vegas and Hollywood and on America's Got Talent. He collects the autographs of every famous person he performs for on playing cards, which he hangs up in his house. He has also performed for former Bills teammates Alex Van Pelt and Jonas Jennings.

=== America's Got Talent ===
In 2016, he performed on the eleventh season of America's Got Talent and made it through the auditions with a card trick. In the Judge Cuts round, Dorenbos got the golden buzzer from guest judge Ne-Yo and immediately advanced to the next round. In the quarterfinal round of the Live Shows, Dorenbos asked all 4 judges to draw something on paper, predicted which judge drew what, and then a bottle was broken that contained his correct predictions of all of the judges' drawings. In the semifinals, he asked the judges to throw a football at a U.S. map, then revealed 4 quarters from a locked chest whose "tail" sides represented the states hit by the judges' footballs. Dorenbos also revealed a hidden map that predicted the locations of the judges' throws. This performance resulted in his advancing to the Top 10 finals on September 13, 2016, where he told an inspirational story while manipulating playing cards that the judges signed. He finished in 3rd place for the season, with Austrian magician and mentalist duo The Clairvoyants in second place and singer/songwriter Grace VanderWaal as the winner.

In 2019 it was announced he will compete on America's Got Talent: The Champions. He performed in the third episode of the series and was the third-runner up for his episode behind Billy & Emily England and Paul Potts. However, he was advanced to the final with the wildcard. He then was eliminated in the final 12 missing out on advancing to the final 5 acts.

== Other ventures ==
In the offseason, Dorenbos serves as a corporate motivational speaker and has spoken for companies such as The Home Depot, the National FFA Organization, Pioneer Investments, Jackson Hewitt, Comcast and ING Group. He is the executive producer of an album called Stripped Down with singer Steve Carlson, who is also his best friend. Dorenbos started his own business in Buffalo, New York, called DAC Framing. He works with several charities, including Brian Moorman's "Punt Foundation," which helps children with terminal diseases, and Garth Brooks' "Teammates for Kids".

Dorenbos is the host of Inside the Eagles, which airs on Eagles Television Network. In 2009, he won a Mid Atlantic Emmy Award for his performances.

Dorenbos was a guest speaker at Tony Robbins's March 23, 2024 virtual “Unleash the Power Within” virtual event.

== Personal life ==
During a physical, Dorenbos was diagnosed with an aortic aneurysm, and required open-heart surgery. He has since recovered and is doing well. Dorenbos appeared on The Ellen DeGeneres Show as a helper in November 2017 and March and May 2018.
