= America's Got Talent season 11 =

America's Got Talent
- Season 11
- Promotional poster for season 11, featuring (L to R) host Cannon, and judges Klum, Cowell, Mel B, Mandel.
- Showrunners: Jason Raff; Sam Donnelly
- Hosted by: Nick Cannon
- Judges: Howie Mandel; Mel B; Heidi Klum; Simon Cowell
- Winner: Grace VanderWaal
- Runner-up: The Clairvoyants
- Finals venue: Dolby Theatre
- No. of episodes: 26

Release
- Original network: NBC
- Original release: May 31 – September 14, 2016

Season chronology
- ← Previous; Season 10 Next → Season 12

Judges and Host for America's Got Talent Season 11

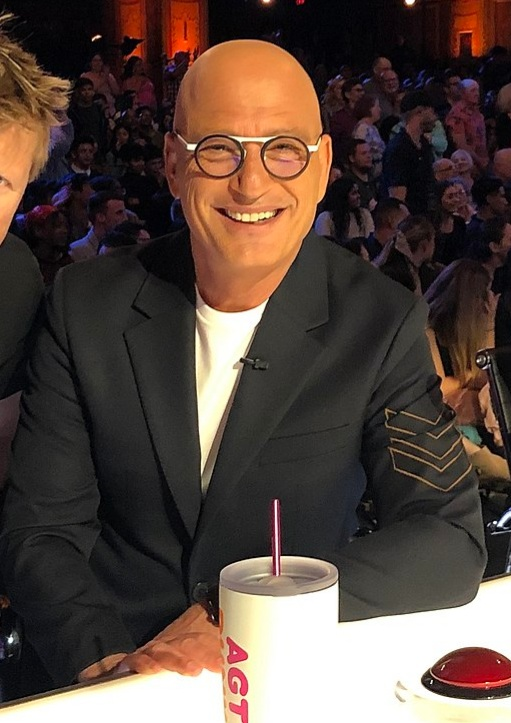
Howie Mandel

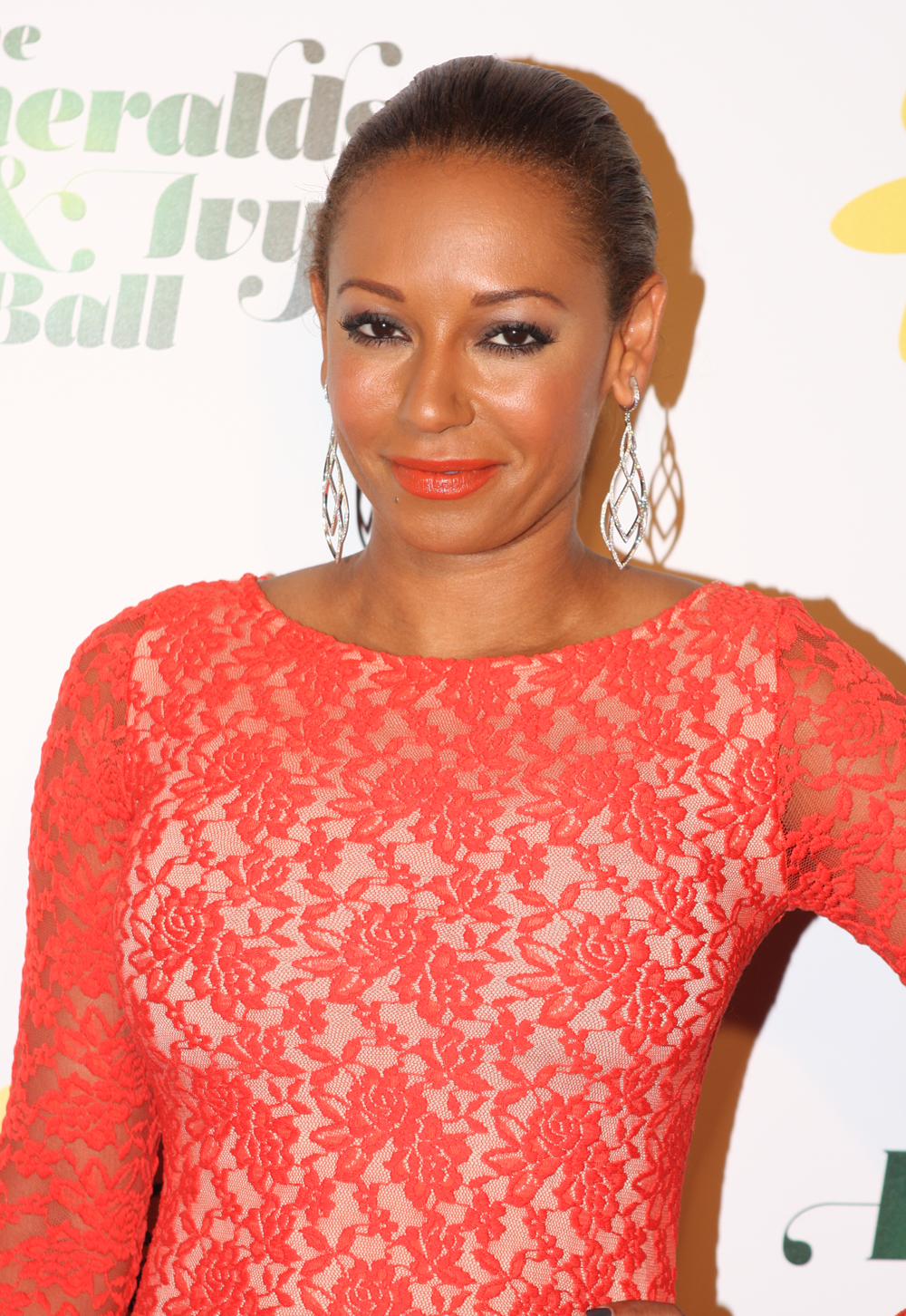
Mel B

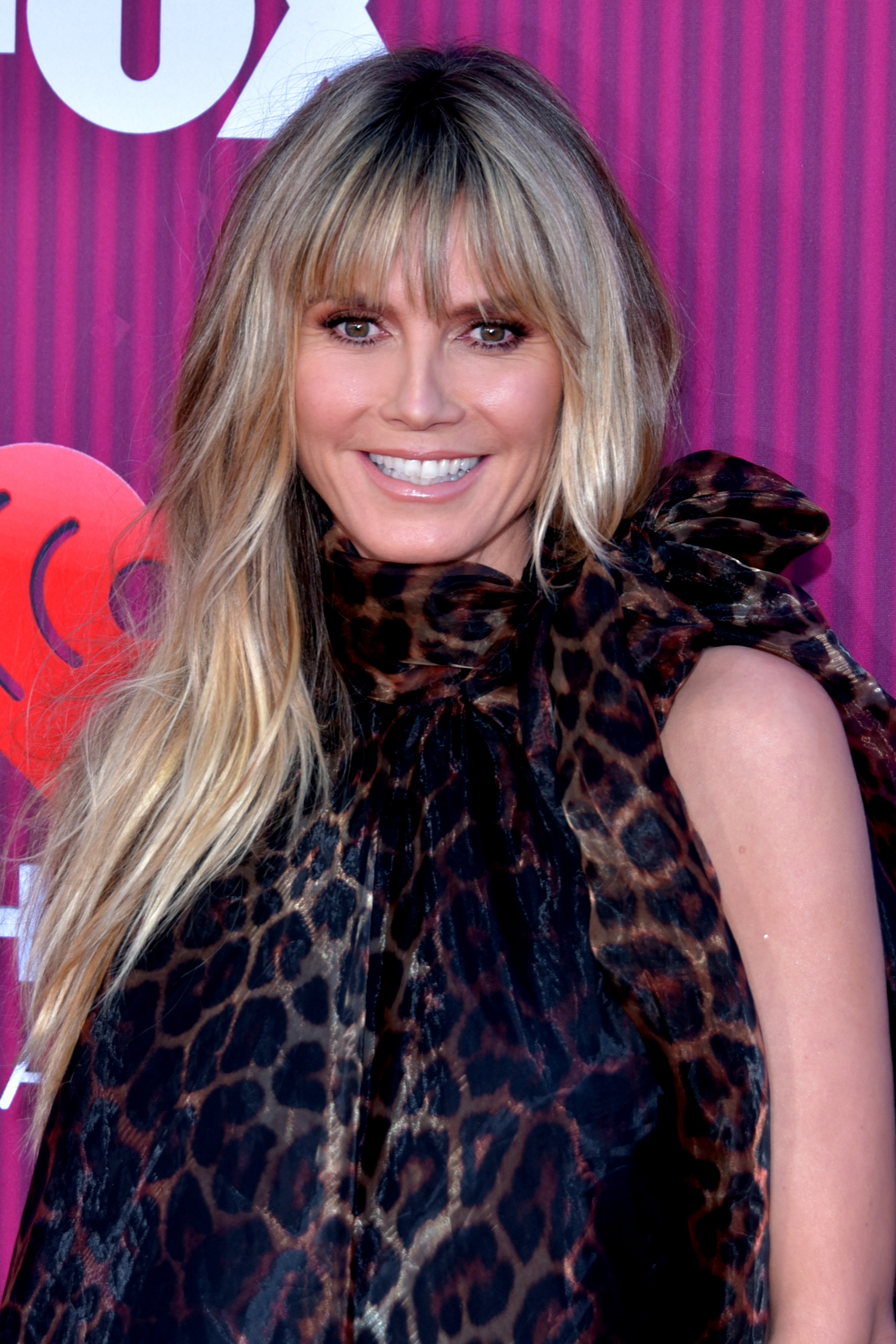
Heidi Klum

Simon Cowell

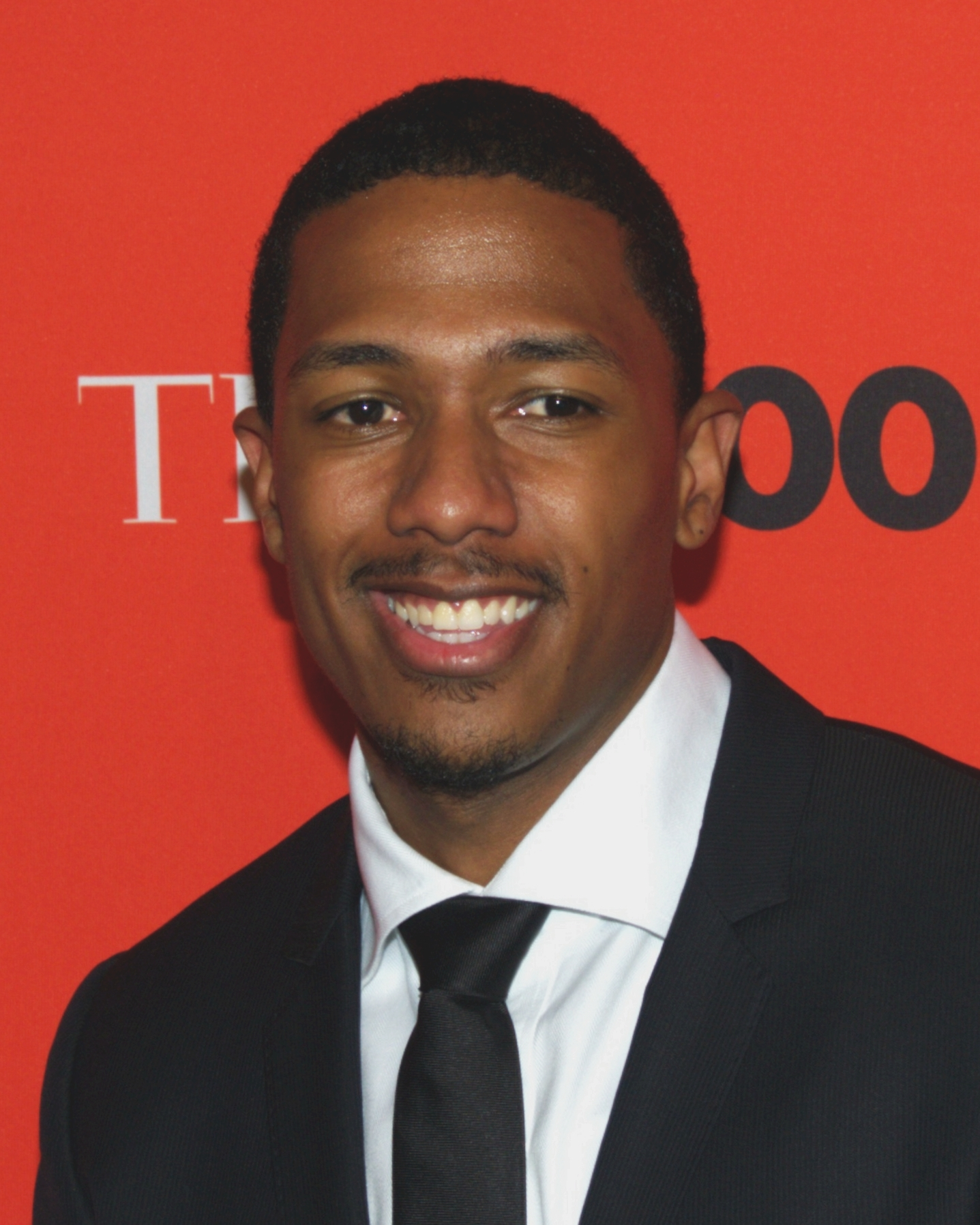
Nick Cannon

The eleventh season of American talent show competition series America's Got Talent was broadcast on NBC from May 31 to September 14, 2016. After the previous season, Howard Stern was replaced as a judge by the Got Talent creator, Simon Cowell. Stern's departure removed the contractual condition he had imposed for his involvement, leading to moving live round productions to the Dolby Theatre in Los Angeles. While open auditions were held in multiple cities, the judges' auditions were filmed within the Pasadena Civic Auditorium in Pasadena, California, an arrangement that would persist in future seasons.

Along with those changes, the "Golden Buzzer" format was adjusted, and a planned break was made in the season's broadcast schedule between August 2–23 to avoid clashing with the network's live coverage of the 2016 Summer Olympics. The guest judges for the season's Judge Cuts stage included George Lopez, Reba McEntire, Ne-Yo and Louis Tomlinson.

The eleventh season was won by singer and ukuleleist Grace VanderWaal, with mentalist duo The Clairvoyants finishing second, and magician Jon Dorenbos placing third. During its broadcast, the season averaged around 11.44 million viewers per episode. The eleventh season became prominent in the program's history for broadcasting a stunt on live television which went wrong nearly resulted in the death of its performer.

== Season overview ==
Open auditions for the eleventh season began in late 2015 and were held in Detroit, New York City, Phoenix, Salt Lake City, Las Vegas, San Jose, San Diego, Kansas City, Los Angeles, Atlanta, Orlando, and Dallas. Online auditions were also accepted. Unlike previous years which had used multiple venues, sessions of the judges' auditions were held at a fixed venue, taking place around March 2016 at the Pasadena Civic Auditorium in Pasadena, California. This arrangement for auditions was continued in later seasons of the show. Actor George Lopez, singer and actress Reba McEntire, singer Ne-Yo and singer Louis Tomlinson were guest judges in the Judge Cuts stage of the competition.

Before the tenth season aired, Howard Stern announced it would be his last season on AGT during his radio show, as his work schedule in the coming year would make him unable to remain committed to performing as a judge. His announcement led to a replacement for the next season, after NBC renewed the program for another year. AGT creator, Simon Cowell, replaced Stern for the upcoming season. Cowell continued with his role of Britain's Got Talent in the same year.

Due to Stern's departure, the live rounds were no longer restricted to being held within New York at Radio City Music Hall. The live rounds for the new season were brought back to Los Angeles and held in the Dolby Theatre. Other than the change in venue, the "Golden Buzzer" could be used by the host, although only in the first stage of auditions (not during the Judge Cuts). Taking the 2016 Summer Olympics into account (which received coverage by the network), the season included not only a break between August 9–17, but it included two episodes of the Judge Cuts in a span of two weeks to ensure the hiatus happened.

Of the participants who auditioned for the season, thirty-six secured a place in the live quarter-finals, with twelve quarter-finalists in each one. Among these were opera singer Laura Bretan, singer and ukuleleist Grace VanderWaal, jazz singer Sal Valentinetti, singer Calysta Bevier and burlesque dancer Dorothy Williams, who had each received a golden buzzer from the main judges and host; magician Jon Dorenbos, contortionist and aerialist Sofie Dossi, malambo group Malevo and singer Jayna Brown, who had each received a golden buzzer from the guest judges; dance group Flip, video-mapping dance duo Sila Sveta and magician Steven Brundage who were chosen as Wildcard quarter-finalists. About twenty-two quarter-finalists advanced and split between the two semi-finals, including juggling duo The Passing Zone (chosen as the Wildcard semi-finalist), with ten semi-finalists securing a place in the finals. Here are the results of each participant's overall performance during the season:

Winner | Runner-up | Third place | Finalist | Semi-finalist
Quarter-finalist | Wildcard Quarter-finalist | Wildcard Semi-finalist
Golden Buzzer - Auditions | Golden Buzzer - Judge Cuts

Participant	Age(s) ^{1}	Genre	Act	From	Quarter-Final	Result
Alla & Daniel	8 & 32	Dance	Ballroom Duo	Upland, California	3	Eliminated
Blake Vogt	27	Magic	Magician	Lebanon, Indiana	3	Semi-finalist
Brian Justin Crum	28	Singing	Singer	San Diego, California	3	Grand-finalist
Calysta Bevier	16	Singing	Singer	Grand Rapids, Ohio	2	Semi-finalist
Daniel Joyner	17	Singing	Singer	Alamo, Tennessee	1	Eliminated
Deadly Games	32 & 34	Danger	Knife Throwing Duo	Las Vegas	1	Semi-finalist
Dorothy Williams	91	Dance	Burlesque Dancer	Hilo, Hawaii	1	Eliminated
Edgar	15-36	Singing / Music	Family Band	Los Angeles	3	Semi-finalist
Flip	14-17	Dance	Dance Group	Lévis, Canada	2	Eliminated
Grace VanderWaal	12	Singing / Music	Singer & Ukuleleist	Suffern, New York	3	Winner
Hara	25	Magic	Illusionist	Japan	1	Eliminated
Jayna Brown	14	Singing	Singer	Baltimore, Maryland	1	Semi-finalist
Jon Dorenbos	35	Magic	Magician	Philadelphia	1	Third place
Julia Scotti	63	Comedy	Comedian	Whiting, New Jersey	3	Eliminated
Kadan Bart Rockett	10	Magic	Magician	Los Angeles	3	Semi-finalist
Kadie Lynn Roberson	12	Singing / Music	Singer & Guitarist	Kemp, Texas	2	Semi-finalist
Laura Bretan	14	Singing	Opera Singer	Chicago	1	Finalist
Linkin' Bridge	36-41	Singing	Vocal Group	Louisville, Kentucky	3	Finalist
Lori Mae Hernandez	13	Comedy	Comedian	Lancaster, California	1	Semi-finalist
Malevo	17-42	Dance	Malambo Group	Buenos Aires, Argentina	3	Semi-finalist
Moya Angela	32	Singing	Singer	Las Vegas	2	Eliminated
Musicality	15-18	Singing	Vocal Group	Chicago	1	Semi-finalist
Outlawz	17-20	Dance	Dance Group	Gilbert, Arizona	1	Eliminated
Ronee Martin	62	Singing	Singer	Columbia, Virginia	3	Eliminated
Ryan Stock & AmberLynn	34 & 34	Danger	Sideshow Duo	Las Vegas	2	Eliminated
Sal Valentinetti	21	Singing	Jazz Singer	Bethpage, New York	2	Grand-finalist
Sila Sveta	20-35	Dance	Videomapping Act	Los Angeles	1	Eliminated
Sofie Dossi	15	Acrobatics	Contortionist	Cypress, California	2	Finalist
Sos & Victoria	37 & 44	Magic	Quick Change Duo	Mannheim, Germany	2	Eliminated
Steven Brundage	25	Magic	Magician	Saratoga Springs, New York	2	Semi-finalist
Tape Face	37	Comedy	Mime	Canterbury, New Zealand	1	Finalist
The Clairvoyants	28 & 29	Magic	Mentalist Duo	Vienna, Austria	2	Runner-up
The Passing Zone	49	Variety	Juggling Duo	Hermosa Beach, California	3	Semi-finalist
ThroWings	25 & 29	Acrobatics	Trapeze Duo	Boston	2	Eliminated
Vello Vaher	52	Acrobatics	Contortionist	Tallinn, Estonia	3	Eliminated
Viktor Kee	45	Variety	Juggler	Priluki, Ukraine	2	Finalist

- ^1 Ages denoted for a participant(s), pertain to their final performance for this season.

=== Quarter-finals summary ===
Buzzed Out | Judges' choice | Advanced to Semi-finals
Won Online Public Vote | Won Judges' Vote | Lost Judges' Vote

==== Quarter-final 1 (July 26) ====
Guest Performers, Results Show: Mat Franco, and Paul Zerdin

Quarter-Finalist	Order	Buzzes and Judges' votes				Result (July 27)
Quarter-Finalist	Order	Cowell	Klum	Mel B	Mandel	Result (July 27)
Jayna Brown	1					Advanced
Hara	2					Eliminated (Judges' Vote Tied - Lost by Public Vote)
Outlawz	3					Eliminated
Musicality	4					Advanced
Lori Mae Hernandez	5					Advanced (Online Public Vote)
Deadly Games ^{2}	6					Advanced (Judges' Vote Tied - Won by Public Vote)
Jon Dorenbos	7					Advanced
Daniel Joyner	8					Eliminated
Tape Face	9					Advanced
Dorothy Williams	10					Eliminated
Sila Sveta	11					Eliminated
Laura Bretan	12					Advanced

- ^2 During the Results show, Deadly Games' picture was portrayed as Daniel Joyner during the Online Public Vote segment; it was later corrected.

==== Quarter-final 2 (August 2) ====
Guest Performers, Results Show: Fitz and the Tantrums featuring Team iLuminate

Quarter-Finalist	Order	Buzzes and Judges' votes				Result (August 3)
Quarter-Finalist	Order	Cowell	Klum	Mel B	Mandel	Result (August 3)
Flip	1					Eliminated
Moya Angela	2					Eliminated
Viktor Kee	3					Advanced
Kadie Lynn Roberson	4					Advanced (Judges' Vote Tied - Won by Public Vote)
Ryan Stock & AmberLynn	5					Eliminated
Calysta Bevier	6					Advanced
Sofie Dossi	7					Advanced
The Clairvoyants	8					Advanced
Sal Valentinetti	9					Advanced (Online Public Vote)
ThroWings	10					Eliminated (Judges' Vote Tied - Lost by Public Vote)
Steven Brundage	11					Advanced
Sos & Victoria	12					Eliminated

==== Quarter-final 3 (August 23) ====
Guest Performers, Results Show: Recycled Percussion, and Michael Phelps

Quarter-Finalist	Order	Buzzes and Judges' votes				Result (August 24)
Quarter-Finalist	Order	Cowell	Klum	Mel B	Mandel	Result (August 24)
Vello Vaher	1					Eliminated
Ronee Martin	2					Eliminated (Lost Judges' Vote)
Kadan Bart Rockett & Brooklyn	3					Advanced
Linkin' Bridge	4					Advanced (Won Judges' Vote)
Alla & Daniel	5					Eliminated
Blake Vogt	6					Advanced
Edgar	7					Advanced
Julia Scotti	8					Eliminated
Brian Justin Crum	9					Advanced
Malevo	10					Advanced (Online Public Vote)
The Passing Zone ^{3}	11					Eliminated
Grace VanderWaal	12					Advanced

- ^3 The Passing Zone were later appointed as the judges' WildCard semi-finalists.

=== Semi-finals summary ===
Buzzed Out | Judges' choice | Advanced to Finals
Won Online Public Vote | Won Judges' Vote | Lost Judges' Vote

==== Semi-final 1 (August 30) ====
Guest Performers, Results Show: The Illusionists

Semi-Finalist	Order	Buzzes and Judges' votes				Result (August 31)
Semi-Finalist	Order	Cowell	Klum	Mel B	Mandel	Result (August 31)
Sal Valentinetti	1					Advanced
Blake Vogt	2					Eliminated
Edgar	3					Eliminated (Lost Judges' Vote)
Lori Mae Hernandez	4					Eliminated
Musicality	5					Eliminated
Deadly Games	6					Eliminated
Tape Face	7					Advanced (Online Public Vote)
Jon Dorenbos	8					Advanced
Grace VanderWaal	9					Advanced
Malevo	10					Eliminated
Laura Bretan	11					Advanced (Won Judges' Vote)

==== Semi-final 2 (September 6) ====
Guest Performers, Results Show: Andra Day, and Blue Journey

Semi-Finalist	Order	Buzzes and Judges' votes				Result (September 7)
Semi-Finalist	Order	Cowell	Klum	Mel B	Mandel	Result (September 7)
Jayna Brown	1					Eliminated
Kadan Bart Rockett & Brooklyn	2					Eliminated
Kadie Lynn Roberson	3					Eliminated
Viktor Kee	4					Advanced (Judges' Vote Tied - Won by Public Vote)
Linkin' Bridge	5					Advanced
The Passing Zone	6					Eliminated
Calysta Bevier	7					Eliminated
Steven Brundage	8					Eliminated (Judges' Vote Tied - Lost by Public Vote)
Sofie Dossi	9					Advanced (Online Public Vote)
The Clairvoyants	10					Advanced
Brian Justin Crum	11					Advanced

=== Finals (September 13–14) ===
Guest Performers, Finale: Pitbull, LunchMoney Lewis

Winner | Runner-up | 3rd place | Top 5

Finalist	Performed with (2nd Performance)	Result (September 14)
Brian Justin Crum	N/A	Grand-finalist
Grace VanderWaal	N/A	1st
Jon Dorenbos	Paula Abdul ^{5}	3rd
Laura Bretan	Il Volo ^{4}	Finalist
Linkin' Bridge	Silhouettes	Finalist
Sal Valentinetti	Jersey Boys	Grand-finalist
Sofie Dossi	Il Volo ^{4}	Finalist
Tape Face	Shon China Lacy ^{6}	Finalist
The Clairvoyants	Paula Abdul ^{5}	2nd
Viktor Kee	Il Volo ^{4}	Finalist

- ^4 Sofie Dossi, Laura Bretan and Viktor Kee conducted a joint routine for their second performance, and thus shared the same guest performers.
- ^5 The Clairvoyants and Jon Dorenbos conducted a joint routine for their second performance, and thus shared the same guest performers.
- ^6 Tape Face also involved a number of the other finalists as part of his second performance.

== Ratings ==
The following ratings are based upon those published by Nielsen Media Research after this season's broadcast:

Show	Episode title	First air date	Timeslot (EDT)	Rating (18–49)	Share (18–49)	Viewers (millions)	Nightly rank	Weekly rank
1	Auditions Week 1	May 31, 2016	Tuesday 8:00 p.m.	2.6	10	11.67	1	3
2	Auditions Week 2	June 7, 2016	Tuesday 8:00 p.m.	2.3	8	10.79	1	3
3	Auditions Week 3	June 14, 2016	Tuesday 8:00 p.m.	2.6	10	11.54	1	5
4	Auditions Week 4	June 21, 2016	Tuesday 8:00 p.m.	2.3	9	11.73	1	1
5	Auditions Week 5	June 28, 2016	Tuesday 9:00 p.m.	2.4	9	11.21	1	1
6	Auditions Week 6	July 5, 2016	Tuesday 8:00 p.m.	2.7	10	12.81	1	1
7	Judge Cuts 1	July 12, 2016	Tuesday 8:00 p.m.	2.4	9	11.54	1	1
8	Judge Cuts 2	July 13, 2016	Wednesday 8:00 p.m.	2.4	9	11.85	1	2
9	Judge Cuts 3	July 19, 2016	Tuesday 8:00 p.m.	2.3	9	11.10	1	2
10	Judge Cuts 4	July 20, 2016	Wednesday 8:00 p.m.	2.3	9	10.78	1	1
11	Quarterfinals, Week 1 (Performances)	July 26, 2016	Tuesday 8:00 p.m.	2.3	9	10.47	1	1
12	Quarterfinals, Week 1 (Results)	July 27, 2016	Wednesday 8:00 p.m.	1.8	8	9.52	1	3 (tie)
13	Quarterfinals, Week 2 (Performances)	August 2, 2016	Tuesday 8:00 p.m.	2.5	9	11.57	1	4 (tie)
14	Quarterfinals, Week 2 (Results)	August 3, 2016	Wednesday 8:00 p.m.	1.8	7	9.39	1 (tie)	8 (tie)
15	Quarterfinals, Week 3 (Performances)	August 23, 2016	Tuesday 8:00 p.m.	2.4	9	11.26	1	1
16	Quarterfinals, Week 3 (Results)	August 24, 2016	Wednesday 9:00 p.m.	2.1	8	10.67	1 (tie)	2 (tie)
17	Semifinals, Week 1 (Performances)	August 30, 2016	Tuesday 8:00 p.m.	2.6	10	12.28	1	2
18	Semifinals, Week 1 (Results)	August 31, 2016	Wednesday 9:00 p.m.	2.0	8	10.50	1	4
19	Semifinals, Week 2 (Performances)	September 6, 2016	Tuesday 8:00 p.m.	2.5	9	11.96	1	6
20	Semifinals, Week 2 (Results)	September 7, 2016	Wednesday 9:00 p.m.	2.0	7	10.61	2	9
21	Finals (Performances)	September 13, 2016	Tuesday 8:00 p.m.	2.8	10	13.97	1	4 (tie)
22	Finale	September 14, 2016	Wednesday 8:00 p.m.	2.8	10	14.41	1	4 (tie)

Specials

Show	Episode title	First air date	Timeslot (EDT)	Rating (18–49)	Share (18–49)	Viewers (millions)	Nightly rank	Weekly rank
S1	Best of Season 11 Auditions	July 6, 2016	Wednesday 8:00 p.m.	1.8	7	8.48	2	5
S2	Quarterfinals Week 3 Recap	August 24, 2016	Wednesday 8:00 p.m.	1.4	6	7.26	2	13 (tie)
S3	Semifinals Week 1 Recap	August 31, 2016	Wednesday 8:00 p.m.	1.2	7	6.46	2	16
S4	Holiday Spectacular	December 19, 2016	Monday 8:00 p.m.	1.8	6	9.54	1	5 (tie)

== Incidents ==
Accidents are uncommon across the Got Talent franchise, but most are usually attributed towards performances that involve highly dangerous stunts and routines. As a matter of principle, production staff often engage a set of necessary precautions for any such routine that will be shown on live television, which can include having paramedics on standby, conducting the performance at another venue, or pre-recording the routine before it is due to be aired for an episode. However, staff on the eleventh season opted to allow for a dangerous stunt to be broadcast live to American viewers, performed by carnival daredevil Ryan Stock, which nearly became a fatal accident when a piece of equipment malfunctioned and nearly impaled the performer's throat with a crossbow bolt. Although he suffered no injuries, production staff were left to question why the performance had been allowed to take place, and altered all footage of the scene for online viewing as a direct result.
