= The Clairvoyants =

Austrian magician and mentalist duo

The Clairvoyants – Thommy Ten and Amélie van Tass
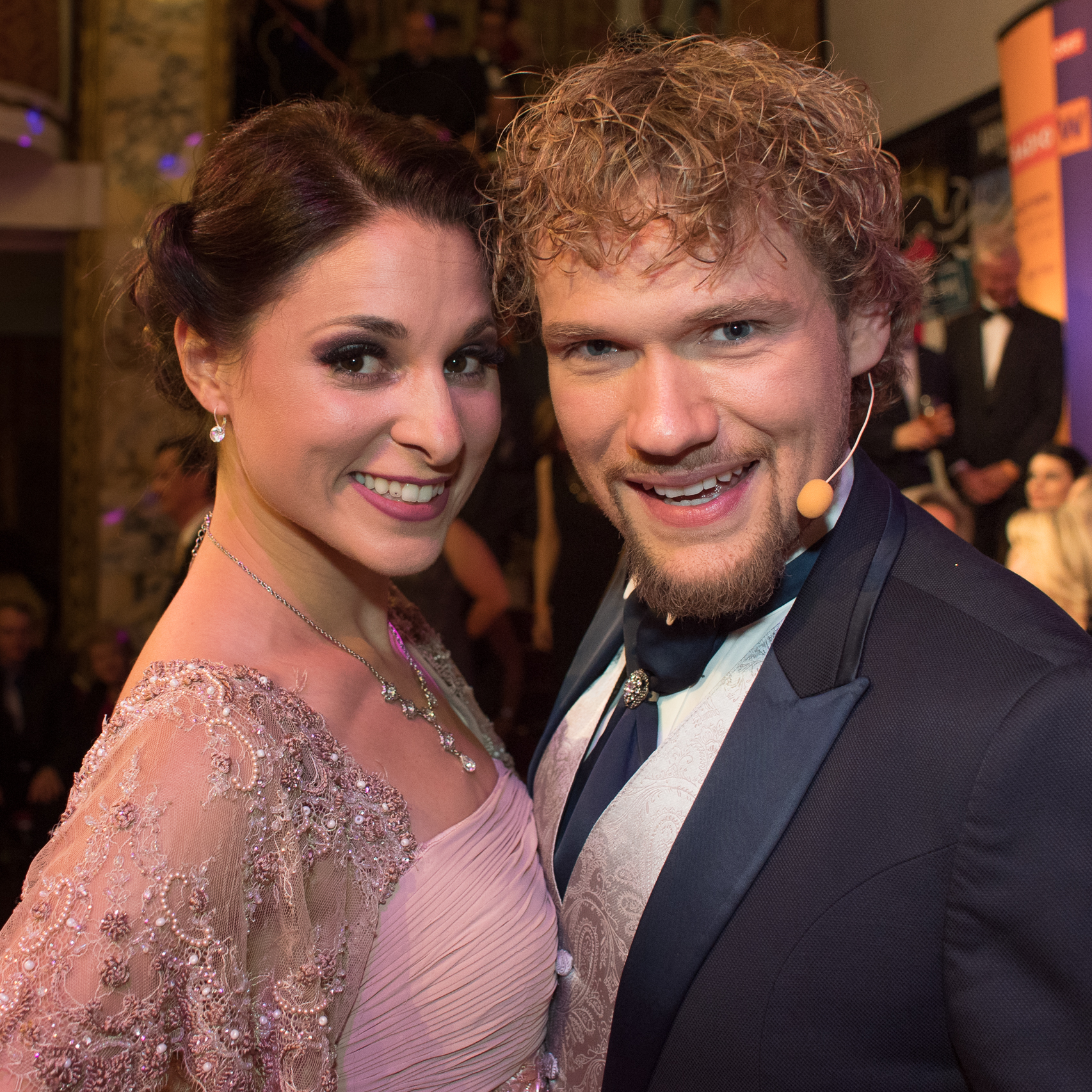
- Amélie van Tass (left) & Thommy Ten (right) in 2017
- Born: Thomas Höschele; Christina Gruber; 1987 (age 38–39); St. Pölten, Austria
- Years active: 2011–present
- Known for: Magic, Mentalism; America's Got Talent
- Website: www.theclairvoyants.com

The Clairvoyants (Thommy Ten and Amélie van Tass) are an Austrian magician and mentalist duo. The two of them have been performing together since 2011. They finished runner-up to Grace VanderWaal on season 11 of America's Got Talent.
