= America's Got Talent: The Champions =

Spinoff to the television talent show America's Got Talent

- Genre: Reality; Talent show
- Created by: Simon Cowell
- Showrunner: Jason Raff
- Presented by: Terry Crews
- Judges: Simon Cowell; Heidi Klum; Mel B; Howie Mandel; Alesha Dixon
- Country of origin: United States
- Original language: English
- No. of seasons: 2
- No. of episodes: 14

Production
- Executive producers: Simon Cowell; Sam Donnelly; Jason Raff; Trish Kinane; Richard Wallace
- Production location: Pasadena Civic Auditorium
- Production companies: Fremantle USA; Syco Entertainment

Original release
- Network: NBC
- Release: January 7, 2019 – February 17, 2020

Related
- America's Got Talent; America's Got Talent: All-Stars; America's Got Talent: Fantasy League; Britain's Got Talent: The Champions

America's Got Talent: The Champions (often abbreviated as AGT: The Champions or simply AGTC) is a spin-off of America's Got Talent (also known as AGT), a televised American talent show competition, created by Simon Cowell. The program is produced by Fremantle for the NBC television network, and first premiered on January 7, 2019. The program functions similar to AGT, but involves a variety of participants taken from across both AGT and the Got Talent franchise – including winners, finalists, live round participants and other notable entries – who compete against each other to secure a place in a grand final, in which the winner receives a cash prize and the title of America's chosen "World Champion" within Got Talent.

The spin-off was hosted by Terry Crews, joined by a panel of judges – for season two, consisting of America's Got Talent judges Cowell, Heidi Klum, and Howie Mandel, and Britain's Got Talent judge Alesha Dixon. Unlike the standard format for any edition of Got Talent, The Champions' contest was not held live – votes for the best act were conducted under a different voting system, and episodes were pre-recorded and aired a few months after the competition has ended. Following the first season, NBC renewed the spin-off for a second season that premiered on January 6, 2020.

NBC did not renew The Champions for a third season. However, in October 2022, the network ordered a similar spin-off known as America's Got Talent: All-Stars, which premiered in 2023.

== Format ==
The format and operations of The Champions differs from that of its predecessor, America's Got Talent. Participants for the competition are chosen by production staff and researchers from those who are most notable within the history of AGT and the Got Talent franchise altogether – those selected with an invite to participate in the contest range from winners, runner-ups and finalists, to the best and most notable acts in the franchise. Once all places are confirmed as filled – each participant must confirm that they are eligible for participation without anything likely to obstruct their involvement – work begins on the competition itself, though unlike in the main program, the competition's individual stages are not broadcast live. Filming of the competition takes place once the first preliminary is ready to be conducted.

The contest is held within a fixed venue, with all the participants divided into five groups of ten performers. Each group was instructed to be at the venue on a specific date to begin their part in the competition in a preliminary round. The preliminary round functions on a mix of formats and arrangements for judges' audition and live rounds. Each participant was held within a waiting area, from where they can watch the performance of other participants, before being called out to get on to the main stage to perform; a montage sequence, consisting of their background and performance in the respective edition of Got Talent, is crafted by production staff, who edit it into the episode of the preliminary round they are performing in. As in the main program, the judges provide feedback on a performance once it is completed, and can use buzzers to denote an act that they do not find interesting, effectively stopping a performance when all buzzers are used. The host remains in the wings, and is filmed at times to provide commentary on the participant's performance for the episode covering the round. Once all participants in a round have completed their performance, an off-stage vote is conducted with a panel of 50 voters, dubbed the "Superfan" panel, which determines which of the ten secures a place in the next stage. Alongside the vote, participants may also advance through receiving a Golden Buzzer from one of the judges or the host. That element's usage was amended for The Champions with an additional condition – only one Golden Buzzer can be used in each preliminary round. If one of the judges or host advances a participant with the buzzer in a given round, the remaining three cannot subsequently do so until the following round. A Wild Card may also be chosen by the judges for the final, once all preliminaries are completed, from any participant eliminated in these rounds. In the finals, the Superfan panel ultimately decide who reach the grand-final and which of the grand-finalists wins the competition.

In the first season, the competition's rules allowed for around fifty participants to compete in The Champions. The format of the program was set around a series of preliminaries, in which a "Superfan" vote, made by a select panel of voters, and the Golden Buzzer, determined who moved on to the next stage; a WildCard vote by the judges also allowed through one more participant for the next stage. The remainder of the contest was then divided between a final, and a grand-final. By the second season, the format was changed. The number of participants was reduced to forty, with the rules of the competition modified so that each preliminary would see around three acts being advanced into a Semi-finals round – two from the Superfan Vote, and the third voted for by the judges amongst the acts placed in 3rd, 4th and 5th respectively – with those reaching the semi-final competing for six places in the Grand-final, alongside those who had advanced into it with the Golden Buzzer.

== Production ==
In May 2018, executive producer and Got Talent creator Simon Cowell met with executives of NBC to propose the idea of a spin-off competition for the franchise. Cowell had conceived of the idea for a global competition, based on the talent that the franchise had produced across the years from its various international editions, including the American original, and suggested that the competition incorporate some of the most memorable and notable participants from across Got Talent's history competing against each other within a venue in the United States, where the franchise originated from. Executives favored the idea greatly, due to the success of America's Got Talent, and opened discussions on the format of the broadcast for the spin-off, which they agreed to have the subtitle of "The Champions". The decision was for the contest to be held between September and October that year, but with the program pre-recorded – filming would take place throughout the competition, and episodes of all stages would be edited before their broadcast as part of the network's 2018/2019 winter schedule, thus ensuring those involved in the spin-off, both host and judges, would not have any conflicting work schedules to prevent their participation on The Champions. The new spin-off soon gained approval for production, and its creation was announced on May 12, 2018.

As part of the new production, Cowell decided that, alongside himself, the judges from America's Got Talent's thirteenth season would be involved in the spin-off competition – Mel B was the first to announce her involvement on July 27, with Heidi Klum and Howie Mandel revealed a month later. However, the main program's host Tyra Banks could not be involved in the spin-off; media outlets had begun speculating that her upcoming work schedule after the thirteenth season would likely lead to her leaving America's Got Talent, which later proved correct in the following months. Instead, Cowell and the producers sought another television personality to take on the role, and chose actor Terry Crews to be the host of The Champions.

America's Got Talent: The Champions second season judges and host

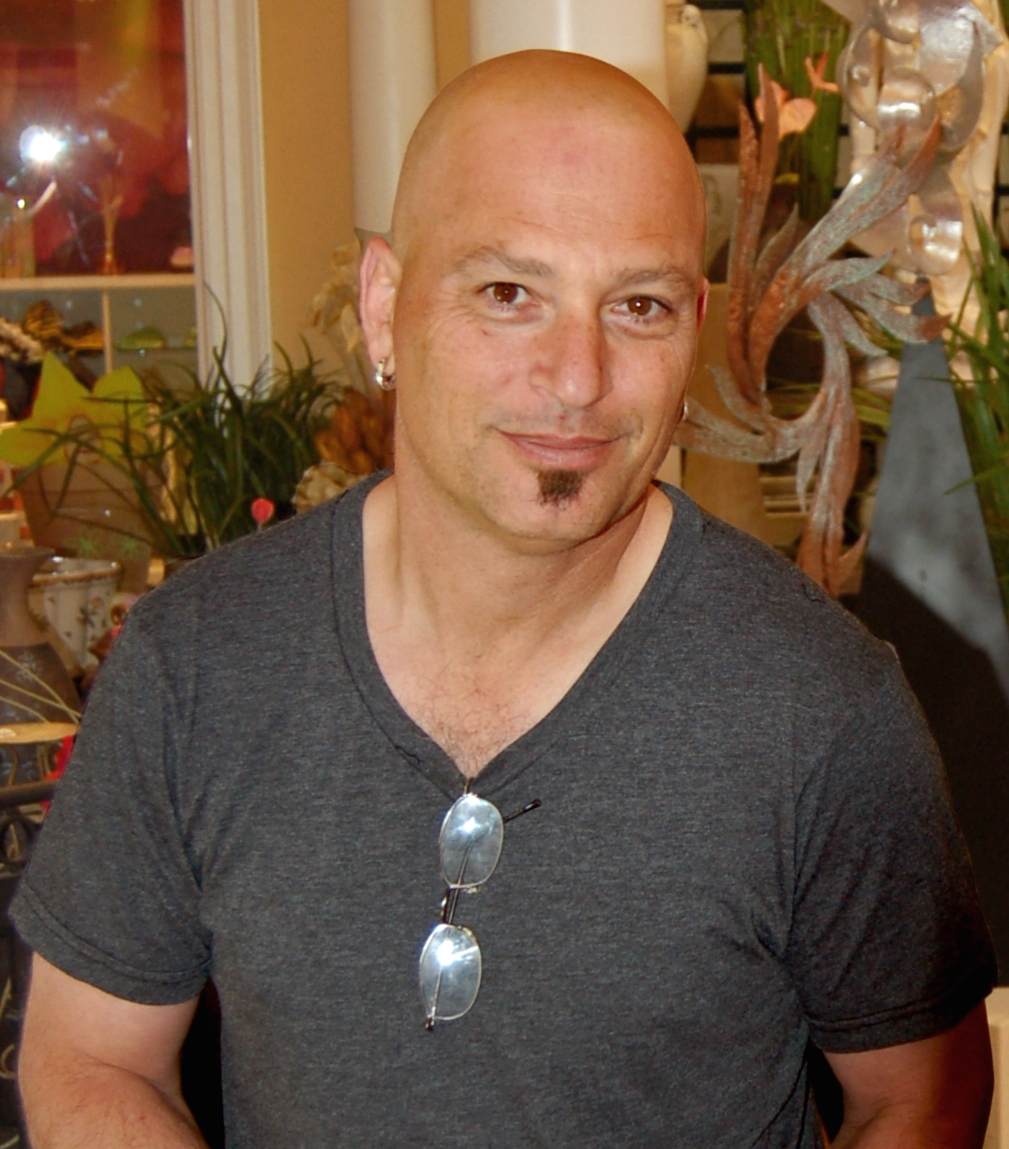
Howie Mandel

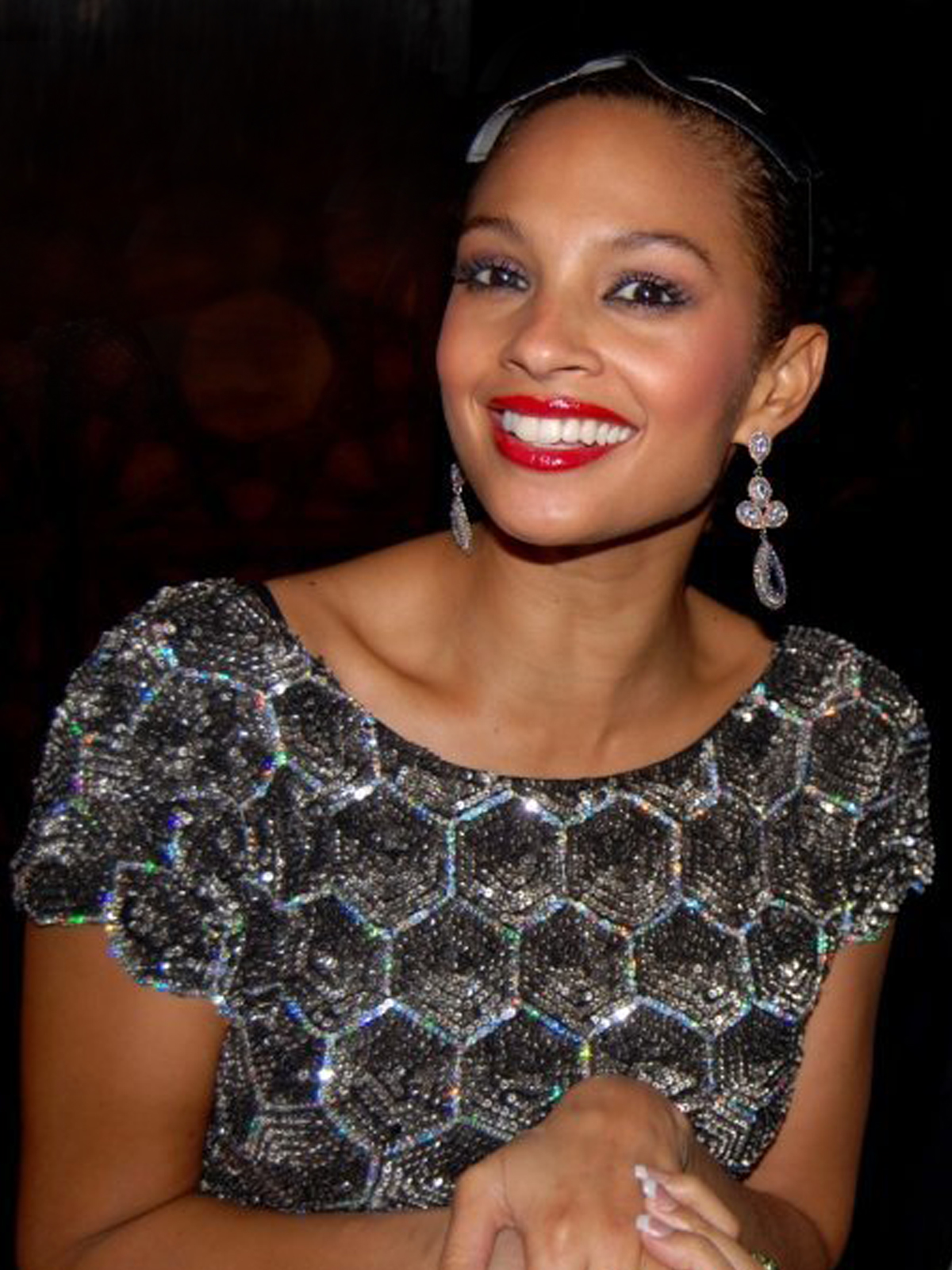
Alesha Dixon

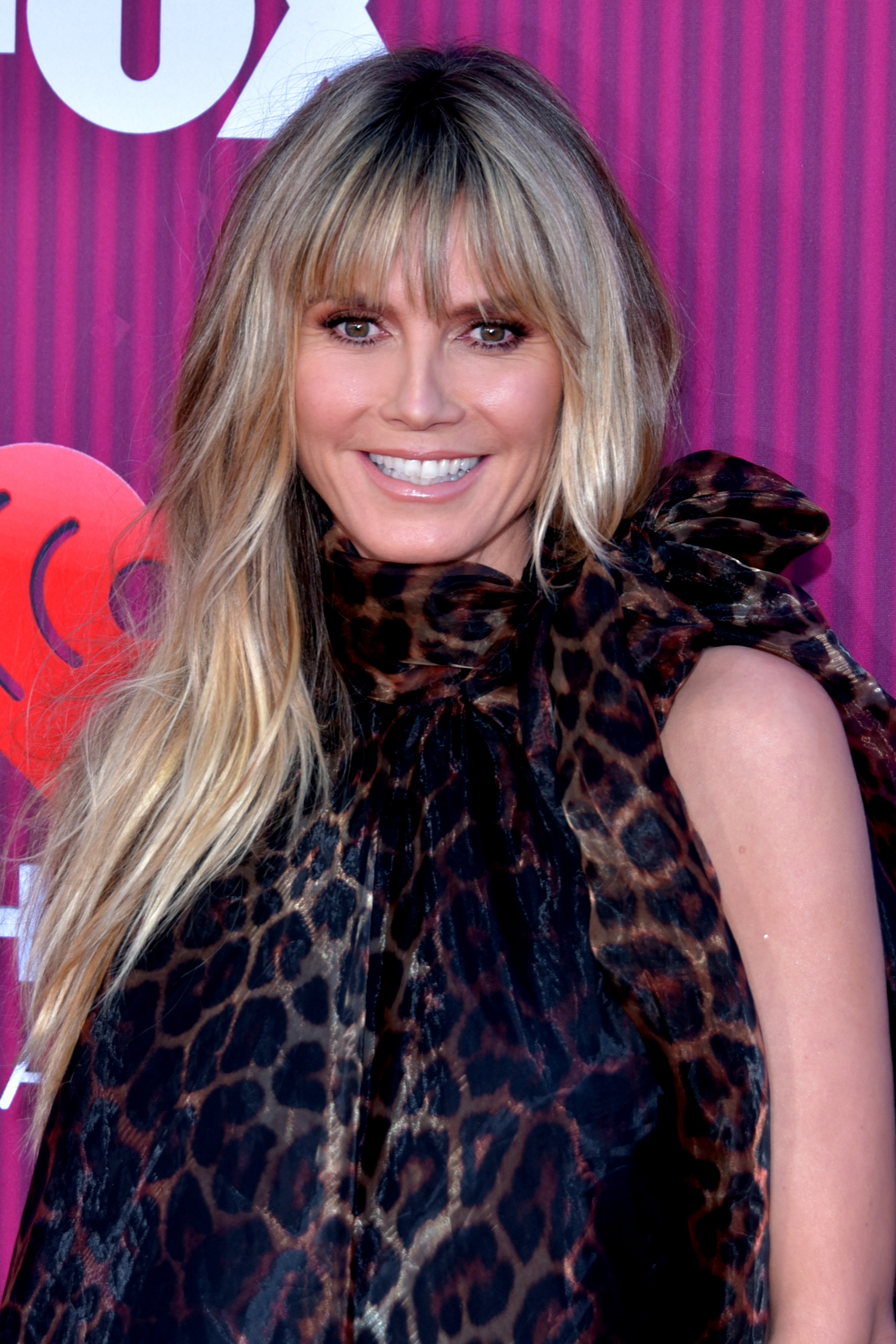
Heidi Klum

Simon Cowell

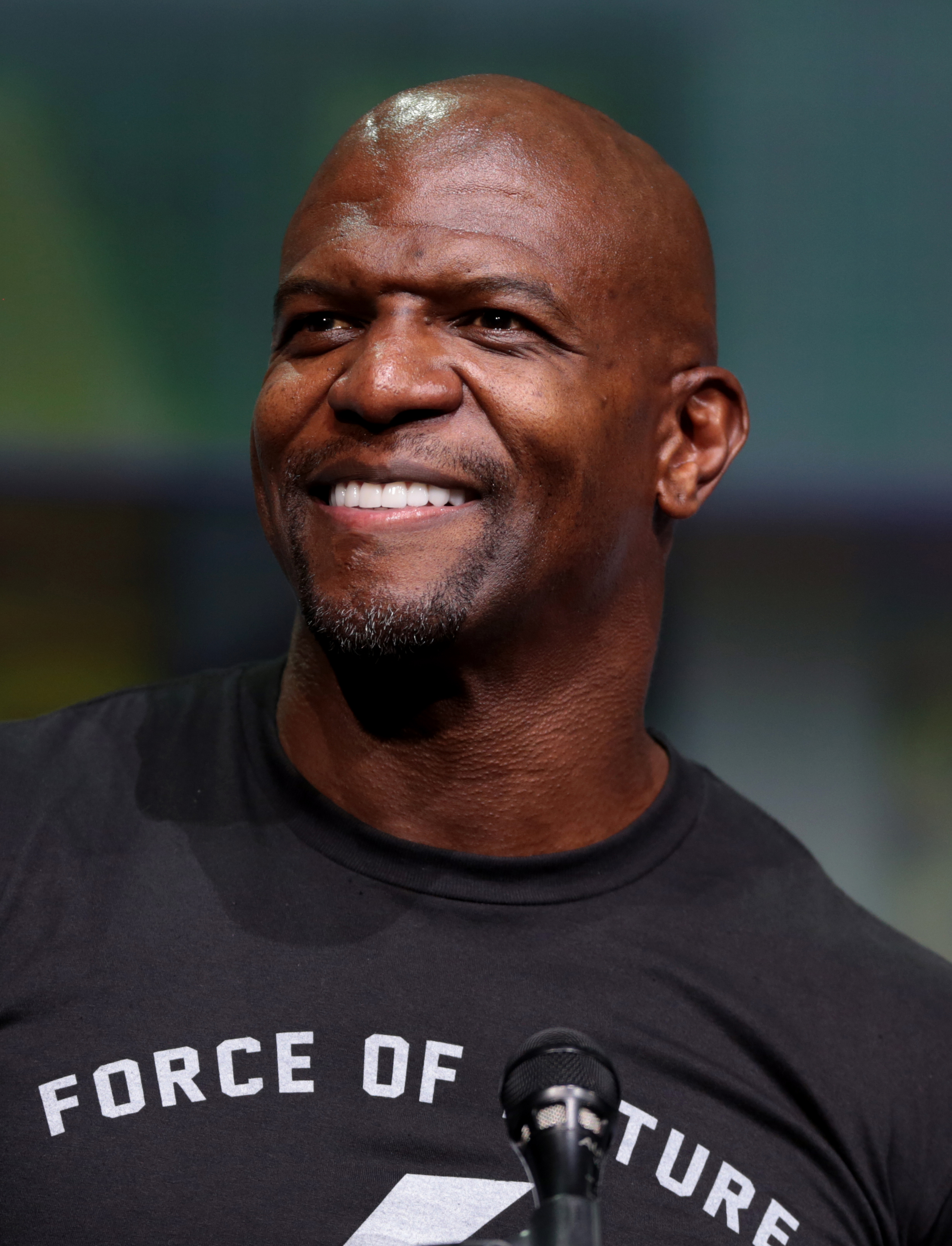
Terry Crews

The program proved popular following its broadcast, with NBC later commissioning The Champions for a second season. On September 26, 2019, Crews, Cowell, Mandel and Klum were revealed as returning for the new season, with singer and Britain's Got Talent judge Alesha Dixon replacing Mel B, after she had left America's Got Talent prior to the fourteenth season.

== Episodes ==
=== Series overview ===
Season	Episodes	Originally released		Average viewers (millions)
Season	Episodes	First released	Last released	Average viewers (millions)
1	7	January 7, 2019	February 18, 2019	10.13
2	7	January 6, 2020	February 17, 2020	7.21

=== Season 1 (2019) ===
Around 50 participants from across the Got Talent franchise, ranging from winners, live round participants – both quarter-finalists (where applicable) and semi-finalists – and other notable acts, participated during The Champions contest in 2019, with each of the contest's preliminaries featuring around 10 participants and around 12 of these securing a place within the finals – five from Golden Buzzers, five from public votes, and two chosen as Wildcards. The winner for the season was Shin Lim, who had previously won the thirteenth season of America's Got Talent.

No. overall	No. in season	Title	Original release date	Prod. code	U.S. viewers (millions)
1	1	"The Champions One"	January 7, 2019	101	9.97
2	2	"The Champions Two"	January 14, 2019	102	9.98
3	3	"The Champions Three"	January 21, 2019	103	9.70
4	4	"The Champions Four"	January 28, 2019	104	10.45
5	5	"The Champions Five"	February 4, 2019	105	9.79
6	6	"The Champions Finals"	February 11, 2019	106	10.44
7	7	"The Champions Results Finale"	February 18, 2019	107	10.57

=== Season 2 (2020) ===
Around 40 participants from across the Got Talent franchise, ranging from winners, live round participants – quarter-finalists (where applicable), semi-finalists and finalists – and other notable acts, will participate during The Champions contest in 2020, with each of the contest's preliminaries featuring around 10 participants. While those receiving a golden buzzer in each preliminary would secure an automatic place in the grand-final, remaining places would be competed for in two semi-finals, each consisting of the two highest voted in each preliminary, along with a third in each voted for by the judges from amongst those placing 3rd, 4th and 5th respectively in the audience vote. The Acrobatic Dance Group V.Unbeatable from 14th season of America's Got Talent were this season's winners.

No. overall	No. in season	Title	Original release date	Prod. code	U.S. viewers (millions)
8	1	"The Champions One"	January 6, 2020	201	8.06
9	2	"The Champions Two"	January 13, 2020	202	6.52
10	3	"The Champions Three"	January 20, 2020	203	7.05
11	4	"The Champions Four"	January 27, 2020	204	7.35
12	5	"The Champions Semi Finals"	February 3, 2020	205	6.73
13	6	"The Champions Finals"	February 10, 2020	206	7.16
14	7	"The Champions Results Finale"	February 17, 2020	207	7.60

== Ratings ==
=== Season 1 ===
Episode	Title	First air date	Rating (18–49)	Share (18–49)	Viewers (millions)	Nightly Rank	Weekly Rank
1	The Champions One	January 7, 2019	1.8	7	9.97	1	7
2	The Champions Two	January 14, 2019	1.7	7	9.98	1	6
3	The Champions Three	January 21, 2019	1.6	6	9.70	1	2
4	The Champions Four	January 28, 2019	1.8	8	10.45	1	7
5	The Champions Five	February 4, 2019	1.6	7	9.79	2	4
6	The Champions Finals	February 11, 2019	1.7	7	10.44	2	2
7	The Champions Results Finale	February 18, 2019	1.7	7	10.57	2	6

=== Season 2 ===
Episode	Title	First air date	Rating (18–49)	Share (18–49)	Viewers (millions)	Nightly Rank
1	The Champions One	January 6, 2020	1.3	6	8.06	2
2	The Champions Two	January 13, 2020	1.0	4	6.52	2
3	The Champions Three	January 20, 2020	1.1	5	7.05	2
4	The Champions Four	January 27, 2020	1.1	5	7.35	2
5	The Champions Semifinals	February 3, 2020	1.1	5	6.73	3
6	The Champions Finals	February 10, 2020	1.0	5	7.16	2
7	The Champions Results Finale	February 17, 2020	1.2	5	7.16	3
