= Mandrake d'Or =

French award for magicians

Mandrake d'Or is a French award presented to international magicians as part of the Les Mandrakes d'Or magic festival. Each edition brings together a selection of invited performers from different countries, each of whom receives a Mandrake d'Or statuette. The ceremony has been described in the French press as the "Oscars of magic".

The festival was created in 1990 by a team led by French magician Gilles Arthur. The name of the award refers to Mandrake the Magician, the comic-strip character who performs as a magician.

== Academy and festival ==
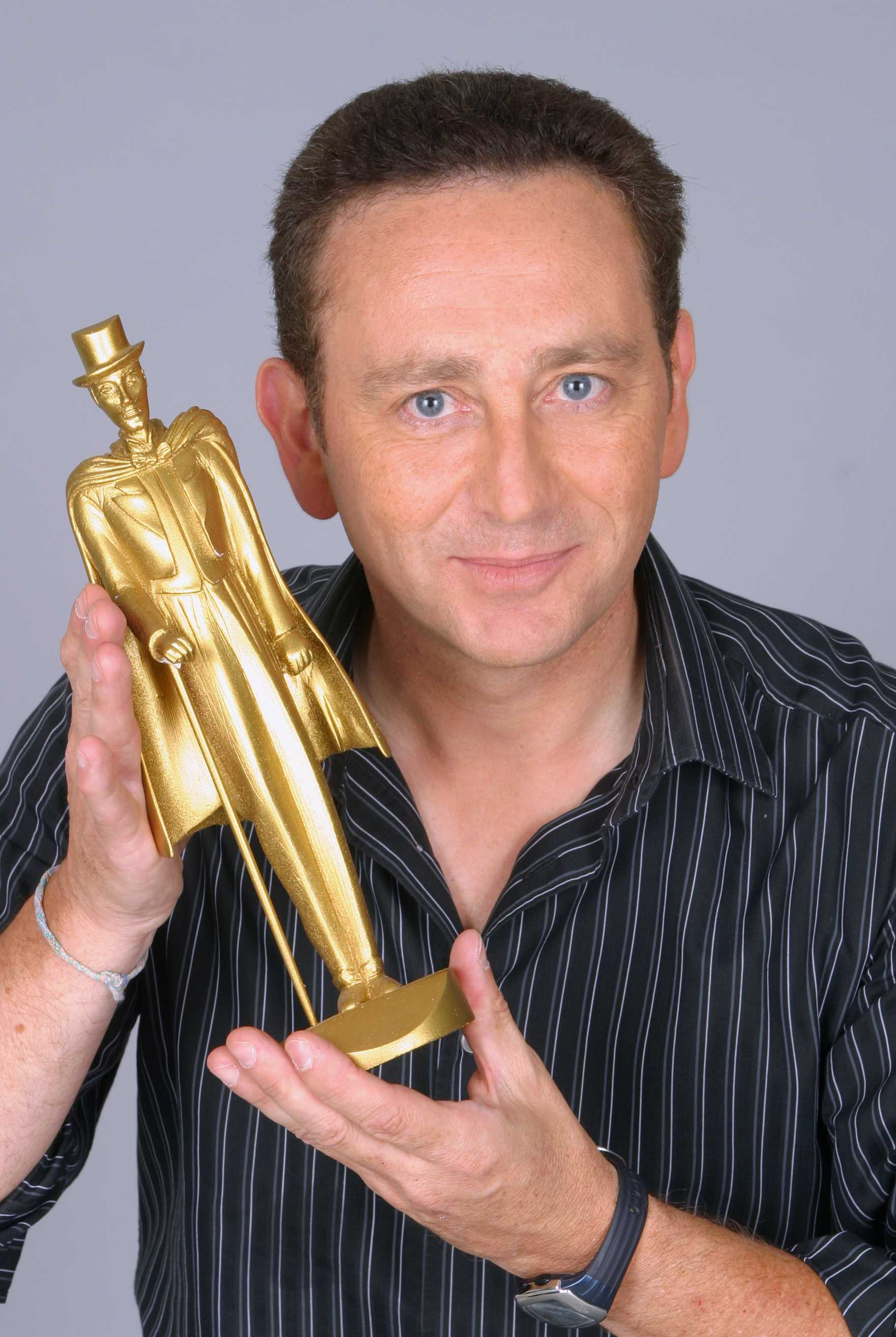
Gilles Arthur with a Mandrake d'Or statuette.

According to the organizers, the Académie Française des Illusionnistes gathers proposals for acts through voting among French magicians' associations. The organizing committee selects the performers invited to take part in the festival, and each selected artist or act receives a Mandrake d'Or statuette during the ceremony. The Mandrake d'Or is not awarded through a first-, second- and third-place ranking; multiple invited performers receive the distinction at each edition. In its coverage of the 2020 ceremony, Le Parisien reported that all ten selected magicians would receive a Mandrake d'Or.

The festival combines the presentation of the awards with performances by international magicians. It was broadcast on France 3 and, in 2000, appeared on TF1 under the title Toute la magie du monde. The commemorative book Les plus grands magiciens du monde, published in 2019, marked three decades of the festival and documented its presence on television. Venues that have hosted the festival include the theatre of the Casino d'Enghien-les-Bains and the Casino de Paris.

In addition to the regular awards, the organization has presented honorary Mandrakes (Mandrakes d'honneur) to figures including David Copperfield, Siegfried & Roy, Penn & Teller and Criss Angel.

== Recipients ==
The following list reproduces the recipients given in the organizers' historical record through 2025. Special distinctions identified in that record are shown in parentheses.

Year	Recipients
2025	Trigg Watson · Ramo & Alegria · Nikolai Striebel · Celia Muñoz · Gaël Brinet · Francesco Della Bona · Mathieu Stepson
2024	Solange Kardinaly · Sangsoon Kim · Jaana Felicitas · Markobi · Ben Rose · Laurent Piron
2023	Henry & Klauss · JunWoo Park · Ding Yang · Nicolas Ribs · Eric Chien
2022	Hollie England · Raymond Crowe · Mag Marin · Fabien Olicard (Special Mandrake) · Artem Shchukin
2021	Winston Fuenmayor · Darcy Oake · Sabine Van Diemen · Aaron Crow · Léo Brière
2020	Léa Kyle · The Clairvoyants · Kevin Micoud · Diego & Elena · Florian Sainvet
2019	Chloé Crawford · Topas · Kevin James · Yu Ho-Jin · Doki Moon
2018	Joséphine Lee · Caroline Marx · Gus · Young-Min Kim · Miguel Muñoz
2017	Moulla · Fabien Olicard · Magus Utopia · Yu Ho-Jin
2016	Enzo Weyne · Luca & Tino · Vincent C (Mandrake "Bad Boy") · Parenthèse Cubique
2015	Alexis Arts · Viktor Vincent · Sos et Victoria Petrosyan · Luc Langevin · Jaime Figueroa · Jerry Pilar · Olivier Heloir
2014	Erick Lantin et Valérie · Doble Mandoble · Lukas · Rémi Larrousse · Erix Logan · Les Chapeaux Blancs · Vincent C
2013	Leon Etienne & Romy Low · Disguido · Charlie Mag · Antoine et Val · Otto Wessely · Fred Compagnie Poc
2012	Dolly Kent · Les Kamyleon · Luca Bono · Kim Hyun Joon · Tony Chapek
2011	Ta na manga · Miguel Gavilán · Charlie Caper · Julius Frack · Les Black Fingers · Pilou (Grand Prix Mandrakes) · Michel Fages
2010	David Goldrake · Laurent Beretta · Rocco Silano · Xavier Mortimer · David Kaplan · Timo Marc
2009	Sebastian Nicolas · Ricardo Harada · David Sousa · Richard Forget · Soma
2008	Christian Farla · Arno · Shimshi · Danny Colle · Alberto Giorgi
2007	Gaetano Triggiano · Kenji Minemura · Peplum et Othello · Marc Dosseto · Mario Berousek · Xavier Tapias
2006	Arkadio · Dion · Éric Antoine · Jan Rouven · Jérome Helfenstein · Mikael Szanyiel · Roxanne
2005	Prince Of Illusion · Carlos Vaquera · Jane · Simon Pierro · Les Alciati · Max · Latko · Bertrand Loth
2004	Double Fantasy · Sergi Buka · Elisabeth Amato · Magic Wave · Sylvia Gaffurini · The Majestix
2003	Sos et Victoria Petrosyan · Les Kamyleon · Aaron Crow · Ruiz De Retes · Peter Marvey · Lee Eun-gyeol · Le Mime Daniel
2002	Norbert Ferré · Rafael · Mirko · Phil Keller · James Brandon · Nathan Burton
2001	Robert Gallup · Winfried et Angélique · Dominique et Alexandra Duvivier · Ayala · Erix Logan · Jérôme Murat · New Absolon
2000	Marko Karvo · Magic Unlimited · Yunke · Mickael Vladimi · Mickael et Betty Ross · Omar Pasha · Mask
1999	Luis de Matos · Sudarchikov · Les Black Fingers · Jade · Victor Voitko · Socrate
1998	Falkenstein · Les Philippart · Galina · Junge Junge · Jorgos · Gérald Le Guilloux
1997	Netcheporenko · Yogano · Greg Frewin · Buka · Bertrand Loth · Christopher Hart
1996	Scott Cervine · Dani Lary · Erix Logan · Connie Boyd · Jonathan David Bass · Jean-Philippe Loupi
1995	Vic et Fabrini · The WILSON'S · Tom Voss · Gilles et Blaise · Kevin James · Victor Voitko
1994	Enric Magoo · Marco Tempest · Nicholas Night · Patrick Droude · Fred Roby · Franklin
1993	Hans Moretti · Jean Madd · Juan Mayoral · Otto Wessely · Les Blackwitt · Jeff McBride
1992	Alpha · Dominique · Rudy Coby · Finn Jon · Al Carthy · Jorgen Samson
1991	Topper Martyn · Norm Nielsen · Yuka · Vladimir Danilin · Jean Merlin
1990	Tina Lenert · Gaëtan Bloom · Juan Tamariz · Jean Regil · Pierre Brahma

== Bibliography ==
- Arthur, Gilles; Loes, Jean-Yves (2019). Les plus grands magiciens du monde: 30 ans de magie, 30 ans de Mandrakes d'or (in French). Éditions Georges Proust.
