= The Illusionists =

Touring magic production

The Illusionists is a touring magic production which features a rotating cast of 5 to 8 magicians who all specialise in specific branches of magic from stage illusions to mind reading to escapology and comedic magic.

== History ==
The show premiered at the Sydney Opera House in Sydney, Australia on 12 January 2012, produced by Simon Painter with Tim Lawson.

== Current/Future productions ==
=== The Illusionists – Live from Broadway ===
Location	Year	Cast Members
Kazakhstan	2018	Harrison Greenbaum (The Trickster), Mark Kalin (The Showman), Jinger Leigh (The Conjuress), Enzo Weyne (The Unforgettable), Krendl (The Escapist), Sebastian Nicolas (The Manipulator), Robyn Sharpe (The Weapons Master)
North America	2018	(In rotation) An Ha Lim (The Manipulator), Jeff Hobson (The Trickster), Jonathan Goodwin (The Daredevil), Colin Cloud (The Deductionist), Kevin James (The Inventor), Darcy Oake (The Grand Illusionist), Chris Cox (The Mentalist)
London	2019	Chris Cox (The Mentalist), Jonathan Goodwin (The Daredevil), Enzo Weyne (The Unforgettable), Adam Trent (The Futurist), James More (The Showman), Yu Ho-Jin (The Manipulator), Paul Dabek (The Trickster)
North America	2019	Sabine van Diemen (The Sorceress), An Ha Lim (The Manipulator), Jonathan Goodwin (The Daredevil), Colin Cloud (The Deductionist), Paul Debak (The Trickster), Raymond Crowe (The Unusualist)
North America	2020	David Williamson (The Trickster), Valentin Azema (The Elusive), Jonathan Goodwin (The Daredevil), Chris Cox (The Mentalist), Hyun Joon Kim (The Manipulator)
Kennedy Center, Washington, D.C.	2024	David Williamson (The Trickster), Kevin James (The Inventor), Chris Cox (The Mentalist), Hyun Joon Kim (The Manipulator)

=== The Illusionists – Direct From Broadway ===
Location	Year	Cast Members
[[Kuwait]{	2018	Leonardo Bruno (The Alchemist), Sos and Victoria Petrosyan (The Transformationists), Yu Ho Jin (The Manipulator), David Williamson (The Trickster), Andrew Basso (The Escapologist), Darren ‘Dizzy’ Partridge (The Trickster)
Canberra & Sydney	2018	Jeff Hobson (The Trickster), Robyn Sharpe (The Warrior), Jonathan Goodwin (The Daredevil), Kevin James (The Inventor), An Ha Lim (The Manipulator), Chris Cox (The Mentalist), Mark Kalin (The Showman), Jinger Leigh (The Conjuress)
Brisbane & Melbourne	2018	Paul Debak (The Trickster), Robyn Sharpe (The Warrior), Leonardo Bruno (The Alchemist), Jinger Leigh (The Conjuress), Florian Sainvet (The Manipulator), Chris Cox (The Mentalist), Mark Kalin (The Showman)
Europe	2019	Luis de Matos (The Master Magician), Andrew Basso (The Escapologist), James Moore (The Deceptionist), Enzo Weyne (The Unforgettable), Yu Ho Jin (The Manipulator), Kevin James (The Inventor), Sos and Victoria Petrosyan (The Transformationists)
Mexico	2019	Aryel Altamar (The Mentalist), Joaquín Kotkin (The Surrealist), Aaron Crow (The Warrior), Florian Sainvet (The Manipulator), Leonardo Bruno (The Escapist), Mark Kalin (The Showman), Matt Johnson (The Alchemist), Sabine van Diemen (The Sorceress)
EUROPEAN TOUR	2020	Prague, Czech Republic – 6. – 9.2.2020 Bucharest, Romania – 13. – 15.2.2020 Athens, []Greece]] – 21. – 23.2.2020 Istanbul, Turkey – 27.2. – 1.3.2020 Minsk, Belarus – 20. – 21.3.2020 Kyiv, Ukraine – 2. – 5.4.2020 Budapest, Hungary – 14. – 18.10.2020

=== The Illusionists – Magic Of The Holidays ===
Location	Year	Cast Members
Broadway	2018	Darcy Oake (The Grand Illusionist), Adam Trent (The Futurist), Colin Cloud (The Deductionist), Shin Lim (The Manipulator), Chloe Crawford (The Sorceress), Light Balance (special guests)
Broadway	2019	Dom Chambers (The Showman), Eric Chien (The Manipulator), Chris Cox (The Mentalist), Paul Dabek (The Trickster), Kevin James (The Inventor), Enzo Weyne (The Unforgettable)
US Tour	2022	Kevin James (The Inventor), Paul Dabek (The Trickster), Chris Cox (The Mentalist), Hyunjoon Kim (The Manipulator), James More (The Grand Illusionist)
US Tour	2023	Kevin James (The Inventor), Steve Valentine (The Trickster), Chris Cox (The Mentalist), Hyunjoon Kim (The Manipulator)

=== Now You See Me Live ===
Location	Year	Cast Members
China	2018-2019	James Moore (The Showman), Florian Sainvet (The Manipulator), Sabine van Diemen (The Escape Artist), Enzo Weyne (The Mentalist)

== Past productions ==
=== The Illusionists - Witness the Impossible ===
Location	Year	Cast Members
Sydney	2012	Brett Daniels (The Grand Illusionist), Dan Sperry (The Anti-conjuror), Andrew Basso (The Escapologist), Kevin James (The Inventor), James Dimmare (The Gentleman), Jeff Hobson (The Trickster), Phillip Escoffey (The Mentalist)
Singapore	2012	Brett Daniels (The Grand Illusionist), Dan Sperry (The Anti-conjuror), Andrew Basso (The Escapologist), James Dimmare (The Gentleman), Michael Halvarson (The Trickster), Phillip Escoffey (The Mentalist)
Mexico	2012	Brett Daniels (The Grand Illusionist), Dan Sperry (The Anti-conjuror), Andrew Basso (The Escapologist), Kevin James (The Inventor), Mark Kalin (The Gentleman), Jinger Leigh (The Enchantress), Joaquin Kotkin (The Surrealist), Jeff McBride (The Shaman)
Brisbane & Adelaide	2013	Brett Daniels (The Grand Illusionist), Dan Sperry (The Anti-conjuror), Andrew Basso (The Escapologist), Kevin James (The Inventor), Jeff Hobson (The Trickster), Mark Kalin (The Gentleman), Jinger Leigh (The Enchantress)
New Zealand	2013	Jeff Hobson (The Trickster), Dan Sperry (The Anti-conjuror), Andrew Basso (The Escapologist), Kevin James (The Inventor), Mark Kalin (The Gentleman), Jinger Leigh (The Enchantress), Philip Escoffey (The Mentalist)
South America	2013	Brett Daniels (The Grand Illusionist), Dan Sperry (The Anti-conjuror), Andrew Basso (The Escapologist), Kevin James (The Inventor), Mark Kalin (The Gentleman), Jinger Leigh (The Enchantress), Joaquin Kotkin (The Surrealist)
Dubai	2013	Jeff Hobson (The Trickster), Dan Sperry (The Anti-conjuror), Andrew Basso (The Escapologist), Kevin James (The Inventor), Mark Kalin (The Gentleman), Jinger Leigh (The Enchantress), Philip Escoffey (The Mentalist);
United Kingdom	2013	Dan Sperry (The Anti-conjuror), Andrew Basso (The Escapologist), Jinger Leigh (The Enchantress), Philip Escoffey (The Mentalist), Mark Kalin (The Gentleman), Jeff Hobson (The Trickster), Kevin James (The Inventor)
Melbourne & Perth	2014	David Williamson (The Trickster), Dan Sperry (The Anti-conjuror), Andrew Basso (The Escapologist), Kevin James (The Inventor), Mark Kalin (The Gentleman), Jinger Leigh (The Enchantress), Anthony Laye (The Mentalist)
United States (30+ city tour)	2014-2015	Andrew Basso (The Escapologist), Aaron Crow (The Warrior), Jeff Hobson (The Trickster), Yu Ho-Jin (The Manipulator), Kevin James (The Inventor), Dan Sperry (The Anti-Conjuror), Adam Trent (The Futurist)
New York City	Christmas 2014	Yu Ho-Jin (The Manipulator), Dan Sperry (The Anti-Conjuror), Jeff Hobson (The Trickster), Andrew Basso (The Escapologist), Kevin James (The Inventor), Aaron Crow (The Warrior), Adam Trent (The Futurist)
London	Christmas 2015	Den Den (The Manipulator), Andrew Basso (The Escapologist), Colin Cloud (The Deductionist), Ben Blaque (The Weapon Master), Jamie Raven (The Magician), David Williamson (The Trickster), Kevin James (The Inventor)

Stunt-actor: Ben Weirheim
Dancers: Kirsty Painter, Hollie Sanford England, Naomi Jeffery, Jennifer Gainey, Todd Hampton, Kane Bonke; Ash McCready; Cat Ferrier, Gemma Facinelli, Laura White, Jason Gray, Kevin Keti, Rachel Bickerton, Danielle Everdell
Assistants: Antonio Hoyos, Ed Hawkins, Claudia James

=== The Illusionists - Live on Broadway ===
Location	Year	Cast Members
New York City	Christmas 2015	Jeff Hobson (The Trickster), Dan Sperry (The Anti-Conjuror), Yu Ho Jin (the Manipulator), Adam Trent (The Futurist), Raymond Crowe (The Unusualist), James More (The Deceptionist) and Jonathan Goodwin (The Daredevil)

=== The Illusionists - Live from Broadway ===
Location	Year	Cast Members
Cancun	Christmas 2015	Hector is Magic (The Master Magician), Leonardo Bruno (The Alchemist), Alex Ramon (The Showman), Michael C. Anthony (The Hypnotist), Hyun Joon Kim (The Manipulator), Aaron Crow (The Warrior), Joaquin Kotkin (The Surrealist), Chris Cox (The Mentalist)
Asia	2016	Krendl (The Escapist), Charlie Frye (The Eccentric), Thommy Ten and Amelie Van Tass (The Clairvoyants), Luis de Matos (The Master Magician), Hyun Joon Kim (The Manipulator), Sam Powers (The Enigma), Leonardo Bruno (The Alchemist)
North America (50+ city tour)	2015-2016	(In rotation) Jeff Hobson (The Trickster), Dan Sperry (The Anti-Conjuror), Yu Ho-Jin (The Manipulator), Kevin James (The Inventor), Andrew Basso (The Escapologist), Ben Blaque (The Weapon Master), James More (The Deceptionist), Colin Cloud (The Deductionist), Adam Trent (The Futurist), Darcy Oake (The Grand Illusionist), Shin Lim (The Manipulator)
Toronto	December 2017	An Ha Lim (The Manipulator), Charlie Frye (The Eccentric), Jeff Hobson (The Trickster), Raymond Crowe (The Unusualist), Jonathan Goodwin (The Daredevil), Colin Cloud (The Deductionist), Darcy Oake (The Grand Illusionist)
Wilmington, DE & Washington, D.C.	December 2017	Andrew Basso (The Escapologist), Kevin James (The Inventor), Adam Trent (The Futurist), Ben Blaque (The Weapons Master), Krendl (The Excapist), Florian (The Manipulator)
Hungary	May 2018	Luis de Matos (The Master Magician), Josephine Lee (The Conjuress), Andrew Basso (The Escapologist), The Deceptionist (James More), Enzo Weyne (The Unforgettable), Yu Ho Jin (The Manipulator), Leonardo Bruno (The Alchemist)

Dancers: Gemma Facinelli, Stephanie Potteiger, Amanda Esposito, Tamara Garrido Fernandez, Rob Coglitore, De'Niko Maurice Welch

=== The Illusionists 2.0: The Next Generation of Magic ===
Location	Year	Cast Members
Sydney	2014	Luis de Matos (The Master Magician), James More (The Deceptionist), Adam Trent (The Futurist), Aaron Crow (The Warrior), Yu Ho-Jin (The Manipulator), Raymond Crowe (The Unusualist), Dr. Scott Lewis (The Hypnotist)
Mexico	2014	Luis de Matos (The Master Magician), James More (The Deceptionist), Adam Trent (The Futurist), Aaron Crow (The Warrior), Kevin James (The Inventor), Yu Ho-Jin (The Manipulator), Special Guest Joaquin Kotkin (The Surrealist)
Melbourne	2015	Luis de Matos (The Master Magician), James More (The Deceptionist), Hyun Joon Kim (The Manipulator), Michael C. Anthony (The Hypnotist), Ben Blaque (The Weapon Master), Raymond Crowe (The Unusualist), Sam Powers (The Enigma)
Perth	2015	Luis de Matos (The Master Magician), James More (The Deceptionist), Hyun Joon Kim (The Manipulator), Michael C. Anthony (The Hypnotist), Jonathan Goodwin (The Daredevil), Thommy Ten and Amelie Van Tass (The Clairvoyants), Sam Powers (The Enigma)
Panama	2015	Jorge Blass (The Maestro), Yu Ho-Jin (The Manipulator), James More (The Deceptionist), Adam Trent (The Futurist), Ben Blaque (The Weapon Master), Aryel Altamar (The Hypnotist), Michael Grasso (The Showman), Joaquin Kotkin (The Surrealist)
Cancun	Christmas 2017	Den Den (The Manipulator), Joaquin Kotkin (The Surrealist), Sam Powers (The Enigma), Mark Kalin (The Showman), Jinger Leigh (The Conjuress), Charlie Mag (The Enchanter), Darren ‘Dizzy’ Partridge (The Trickster)
Europe	2017-2018	Luis de Matos (The Master Magician), Josephine Lee (The Conjuress), Andrew Basso (The Escapologist), James Moore (The Deceptionist), Enzo Weyne (The Unforgettable), Yu Ho Jin (The Manipulator), Leonardo Bruno (The Alchemist)
France	2018	Luis de Matos (The Master Magician), Andrew Basso (The Escapologist), James Moore (The Master of Artifice), Enzo Weyne (The Elusive), Yu Ho Jin (The Virtuoso), Leonardo Bruno (The Elusive), Augustin Petit (The Manipulator)

=== The Illusionists 1903: The Golden Age of Magic ===
Location	Year	Cast Members
Brisbane & Adelaide	2015	Rick Thomas (The Immortal), Mark Kalin (The Showman), Jinger Leigh (The Conjuress), Jonathan Goodwin (The Daredevil), Charlie Frye (The Eccentric), Thommy Ten and Amelie Van Tass (The Clairvoyants), Armando Lucero (The Maestro)
Middle East	2015	Alberto Giorgi (The Alchemist), Mark Kalin (The Showman), Jinger Leigh (The Conjuress), Krendl (The Escapist), Charlie Frye (The Eccentric), Thommy Ten and Amelie Van Tass (The Clairvoyants), Dana Daniels (The Charlatan), Special Guest: Joaquin Kotkin (The Surrealist)
Canberra, Sydney & Melbourne	2015	Alberto Giorgi (The Alchemist), Mark Kalin (The Showman), Jinger Leigh (The Conjuress), Krendl (The Escapist), Charlie Frye (The Eccentric), Thommy Ten and Amelie Van Tass (The Clairvoyants), Dana Daniels (The Charlatan)

=== The Illusionists – Turn of the Century ===
Location	Year	Cast Members
New York & Ohio	Christmas 2016	Mark Kalin (The Showman), Jinger Leigh (The Conjuress), Charlie Frye (The Eccentric), Dana Daniels (The Charlatan), Justo Thaus (The Grand Carlini), Thommy Ten and Amélie van Tass (The Clairvoyants), Rick Thomas (The Immortal), Jonathan Goodwin (The Daredevil)

=== The Illusionists – The Next Generation of Magic ===
Location	Year	Cast Members
Europe	2016 - 2017	Raymond Crowe (The Unusualist), Ben Blaque (The Weapon Master), James More (The Deceptionist), Luis de Matos (The Master Magician), Krendl (The Escapologist), Enzo Weyne (The Elusive), Yu Ho Jin (The Manipulator)

=== The Illusionists – Direct From Broadway ===
Location	Year	Cast Members
Perth	2017	An Ha Lim (The Manipulator), Raymond Crowe (The Unusualist), Jonathan Goodwin (The Daredevil), James More (The Deceptionist), Colin Cloud (The Deductionist), Kevin James (The Inventor), Harrison Greenbaum (The Trickster)
South Africa	2018	(In rotation) Den Den (The Manipulator), David Williamson (The Trickster), Harrison Greenbaum (The Trickster), Darcy Oake (The Grand Illusionist), Mark Kalin (The Showman), Jinger Leigh (The Conjuress), Chris Cox (The Mentalist), Krendl (The Escapist), Ben Blaque (The Weapon Master)
Europe	2018	Luis de Matos (The Master Magician), Josephine Lee (The Conjuress), Andrew Basso (The Escapologist), James More (The Deceptionist), Enzo Weyne (The Unforgettable), Yu Ho Jin (The Manipulator), Leonardo Bruno (The Alchemist)
France	2018	Augustin Petit (The Showman), Luis de Matos (The Master Magician), Leonardo Bruno (The Alchemist), James More (The Deceptionist), Andrew Basso (The Escapologist)
Mexico	2019	Aryel Altamar (The Mentalist), Joaquín Kotkin (The Surrealist), Aaron Crow (The Warrior), Florian Sainvet (The Manipulator), Leonardo Bruno (The Escapist), Mark Kalin (The Host), Matt Johnson (The Alchemist), Sabine van Diemen (The Sorceress)

=== The Illusionists Present The Magic of Adam Trent ===
Location	Year	Cast Members
North America	2017-2018	Adam Trent

=== The Unbelievables ===
Location	Year	Cast Members
Sydney, Melbourne & Perth	2017-2018	Jay Johnson (The Ventriloquist), Yuliya Kurkina (The Artist), Brett Loudermilk (The Blade Master), Shin Lim (The Virtuoso), Sos and Victoria Petrosyan (The Transformationalists), Aleksandra Kiedrowicz (The Floating Phenom), Artem Lyubane (The Titan), Harrison Greenbaum (The Comic), Alfredo and Anna Silva (Deadly Games), Robert Karlos (The Dexterous Dynamo), Alan Pagnota and Rafael Ferreira (Dupla Mão na Roda), Kateryna Klishna, Andrew Nolo, Craig Monley, Sirani Argaet, Craig Monley and Jarryd Byrne (The Ballroom Dancers)

=== The Illusionists – The Best of Broadway ===
Location	Year	Cast Members
UAE	2018	Paul Debak (The Trickster), Jamie Raven (The Magician), Ben Blaque (The Weapon Master), Darcy Oake (The Grand Illusionist), Krendl (The Escapist), Florian Sainvet (The Manipulator), Raymond Crowe (The Unusualist)

== Box Office Records ==
>The Warrior >The Trickster >The Manipulator

== Live Music ==
Until 2016, live music was performed by “Z” (formally known as Mulatto), best known as the live band for hip hop icon Nas. Z is originally from Long Beach, CA. The 2016 "The Illusionists: Turn of the Century" on Broadway featured a live four-piece orchestra performing Evan Jolly's original score.

== TV appearances ==
- America's Got Talent — aired September 2, 2015—Five of the show's seven conjurors appeared on the show.
- NBC Hour Long TV Special — aired December 9, 2015 – The Illusionists brought their show to NBC for the holidays. This television special was filmed earlier in the year during a prior national tour stop at the Orpheum Theater in Los Angeles.
- NBC's Today – aired December 22, 2015 – Jeff Hobson and Adam Trent performed during the 8:30am half-hour.
- The Ellen DeGeneres Show – aired March 14, 2016 – Adam Trent performed two illusions in studio including a trick using a blender and guest DJ's Stephen "tWitch" Boss' iPhone. In another illusion, audience members were chosen at random to pick a lottery number at random. The resulting group of numbers matched those listed on a Powerball ticket allegedly purchased by Trent months prior.
