= Courtney Hadwin =

British singer (born 2004)

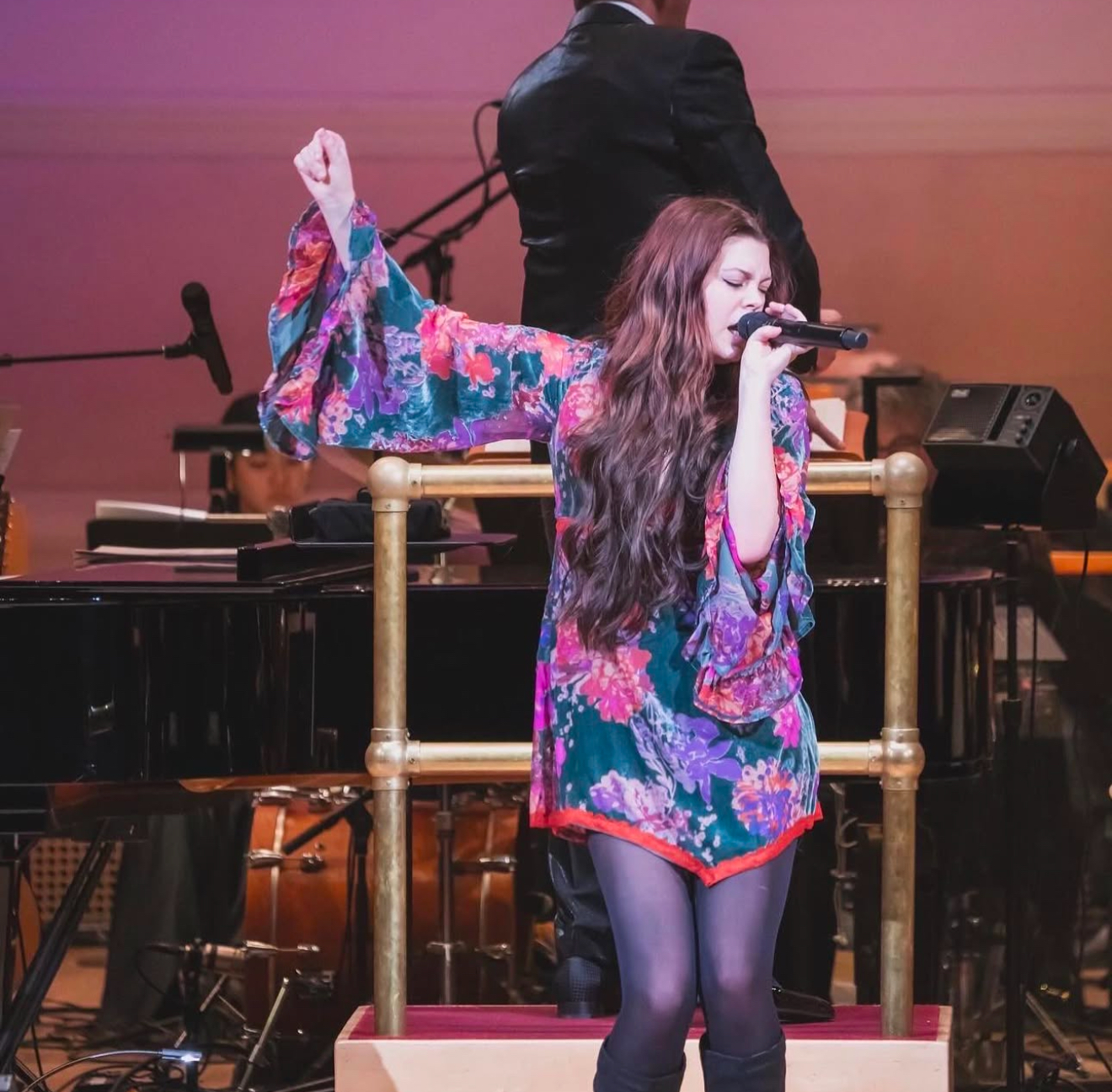
- Courtney Hadwin performing in 2024

Background information
- Born: 6 July 2004 (age 22)
- Occupation: Singer-Songwriter
- Years active: 2015–present
- Labels: Syco; Arista
- Website: courtneyhadwinmusic.com

Courtney Hadwin is an English singer-songwriter. She rose to fame by competing prominently on the first season of ITV's The Voice Kids UK 2017 and the 13th season of the NBC competition show America's Got Talent (AGT) the next year. Her latter audition went viral. By the time of her second performance in 2018 on the first live TV broadcast of AGT that season, the video of her audition had been viewed "over 200 million" times, according to show host Tyra Banks as she introduced Hadwin.

== Early life ==
Hadwin lives in Hesleden in County Durham; she has a brother Paul and a sister Melissa, three and four years younger, respectively. Her parents are Paul and Ann-Marie Hadwin, née Storey. Courtney attended Hesleden Primary School and until autumn 2018 studied at The Academy at Shotton Hall in Peterlee.

Courtney Hadwin has also trained at Shotton Hall Theatre School at TASH in Peterlee, Peanuts Master Classes, Kate Sirs School of Music, and Julie Miles' Vocal Ovation. She was a 2018 finalist on TV's America's Got Talent. Prior to her involvement on AGT she appeared on the first series of The Voice Kids in the UK and afterwards on America's Got Talent: The Champions.

== Career ==
=== Early performances ===
In April 2015, Hadwin auditioned for her first singing competition at TeenStar in Newcastle, England, with her version of Bob Dylan's "Make You Feel My Love", and reached the competition's grand final. She also gained notice when she was filmed performing Great Big World and Christina Aguilera's soaring duet "Say Something" in September 2015 during lunchtime at her school.

In April 2016, she won Hartlepool's Performer of the Year Award, and was a finalist in the Beyond The Lights award ceremony. She was the opening act for Sister Sledge at a South Tyneside Festival concert in July 2017, where she sang for more than 18,000 people. In January 2018, she sang in Southampton at an event for U-Support, raising funds for children with life-limiting illnesses and disabilities.

=== 2017: The Voice Kids UK ===
Hadwin performed Tina Turner's "Nutbush City Limits" in a blind audition for The Voice Kids UK. Will.i.am, one of the three coaches, had her repeat part of her act on The Voice Kids so he could see her dance some more. She was picked by judge Danny Jones, who became her mentor on the show. During the battle round, she performed "Dancing in the Street" against Eboni Green and Hollie Firmin. For her semi-final performance, she sang James Brown's "I Got You (I Feel Good)". For her final performance on 16 July 2017, she sang the torch song "And I Am Telling You I'm Not Going", from the Broadway musical Dreamgirls, before being eliminated as a finalist.

The Voice Kids performances and results (2017)
Episode	Song	Original Artist	Result
Audition	"Nutbush City Limits"	Tina Turner	Through to Battle Rounds
Battle Rounds	"Dancing in the Street"	Martha and the Vandellas	Through to Semi-final
Semi-final	"I Got You (I Feel Good)"	James Brown	Advanced
Grand Finale	"And I'm Telling You I'm Not Going"	Jennifer Holliday	Finalist

=== 2018–2019: America's Got Talent ===
In her audition for the 13th season of America's Got Talent, Hadwin sang Otis Redding's "Hard to Handle". She appeared a bit shy or bashful as she walked onstage talked before singing and dancing wildly, getting the audience up on their feet. Simon Cowell told her "you sing and you're like a lion." A huge fan of Janis Joplin, Howie Mandel referenced "Clive Davis going to the Monterey Pop Festival" and seeing a young girl (Joplin) who no one has ever seen or had known of before. He was the first to weigh in on Hadwin's performance. Mandel couldn't have been more enthusiastic as he compared her rendition to Joplin's debut. Hadwin's performance inspired Mandel to give her a Golden Buzzer, sending her directly to the live shows. Mandel compared Hadwin's singing to Janis Joplin.

Hadwin's audition video received more than 50 million views on AGT's YouTube channel in its first five months. Hadwin returned for AGT's quarter-finals on 14 August 2018, singing "Papa's Got a Brand New Bag" by James Brown. When introducing Hadwin to the live TV audience for the quarter-finals, host Tyra Banks announced that Hadwin's audition had been viewed more than 200 million times. For her semi-final performance on 11 September, she sang "Born to Be Wild" by Steppenwolf, then returned for the final show on 18 September to perform Tina Turner's "River Deep – Mountain High". Considerable controversy arose on the Internet about Hadwin's "hidden" prior experience on The Voice Kids UK in 2017, and about whether or not Hadwin was as shy and bashful as she first appeared at her audition.

Family, friends, and school teachers came to her defense, saying she has been shy throughout her childhood, and many noted that other contestants also had prior experience as contestants before appearing on AGT/BGT. Hadwin's grandfather spoke about how she is painfully shy and has sung in her sleep.

On the results show on 19 September, she sang "Piece of My Heart" with rock band The Struts. Although she failed to win AGT's grand prize, she went to Las Vegas to perform five live shows with winner Shin Lim at the Paris Hotel and Casino from 2–4 November 2018.

America's Got Talent performances and results (2018)
Episode	Song	Original Artist	Result
Audition	"Hard to Handle"	Otis Redding	Golden Buzzer Advance to Quarter-Finals
Quarter-Finals	"Papa's Got a Brand New Bag"	James Brown	Advanced to Semi-Finals
Semi-Finals	"Born to Be Wild"	Steppenwolf	Advanced to Finals
Finals	"River Deep Mountain High"	Tina Turner	Finalist
Season finale	"Piece of My Heart" (with The Struts)	Erma Franklin	Eliminated (6th Place)

In December 2018, Hadwin signed a record deal with Syco Music and Arista Records. In January 2019, she appeared as a contestant on NBC's America's Got Talent: The Champions, where she performed her first original song, "Pretty Little Thing". She has been named as one of the 50 top contestants in all the AGT shows across 194 countries.

=== 2019–2025: Pandemic hiatus and debut as songwriter ===
After her performance (when she was 14) of her original song "Pretty Little Thing" on America's Got Talent: The Champions, Hadwin's first EP was released on 25 October 2019 titled "The Cover Sessions", which includes live covers of "Sign of the Times" by Harry Styles, "Old Town Road" by Lil Nas X, "Sucker" by the Jonas Brothers, and "Someone You Loved" by Lewis Capaldi. She has been described as being "an exceptional talent with a voice and spirit well beyond her years." When an interviewer asked her about her artistic influences, she said, "From Little Richard, James Brown to Janis Joplin, Mick Jagger... It's a really long list!"

Hadwin was slated to perform at the Woodstock 50 music festival which was planned for the 50th anniversary weekend of the original Woodstock Music and Art Fair. Unfortunately, the event organizers encountered significant difficulties in finding a venue (given the disastrous Woodstock '99 festival) and that and a combination of other funding and management problems led to the cancellation of the event.

The COVID-19 pandemic severely limited the live performance of music, and caused or contributed to the cancellation of many music festivals, concert tours and new album releases for years. During the hiatus, Hadwin released a cover of John Lennon's song "Happy Xmas (War Is Over)" on 20 November 2020 to YouTube and music streaming services.

Hadwin was signed to perform at the FM4 Frequency Festival music festival in 2021. However, the festival was cancelled again. At some unknown point, she parted company with the label which inherited her account after Simon Cowell's Syco Music label ceased operations, as evidenced by a comment from Hadwin in response to a fan's (YouTube user 'Hal Dayley') comment mentioning 'Simon' on her YouTube channel post of her first music video released in 2023, 'Breakable'. She responded to the comment, "It’s all me for this one completely independent finally doing it MY WAY."

On 24 February 2023, Hadwin released her new original single, "Breakable," on both YouTube and on music streaming services. She wrote the song with producer Kevin Bowe, who works with her. On 7 April 2023, she released a new single, again an original, "That Girl Don't Live Here". On 28 July 2023, she released a new single, a soulful original ballad, "Call Me Back".

On 29 September, 2023, Hadwin released her 4th original single of the year, a hard-rocking tale appropriate for the Halloween season (or any season, really, as the lyrics are about the challenges of maintaining mental health when stressed), titled "Monsters". It is considered to be a quite upbeat tune for a serious topic in the lyrics. A number of listeners reacting to the song noted that it is a positive feature of the song. On 11 October, 2023, Xander Zellner, a journalist and charts/data analyst at Billboard, reported that Hadwin's self-released original single "Monsters" charted at No.19 on Billboard's "Hard Rock Digital Song Sales" chart.

On 24 November 2023, Hadwin released her fifth new original single of the year, a fun, fast, hard-rocking upbeat Christmas song titled "Christmas Rocks" to both YouTube and streaming services.

On 30 April 2024, Hadwin performed for Clive Davis at New York Pops' 41st Birthday Gala in his honor, On 29 October 2024, Hadwin recorded all her songs live at Metropolis Studios.

Hadwin has shared a music video for her pop-punk influenced single ‘Spellbound’.

Hadwin has shared a music video for her classic blues single ‘You Only Love Me When I Lie’.

Courtney signed to MN2S agency in 2024, but left because they couldn't get her any gigs and she signed to Oliver Moheda at Total Artist Management for management.

=== 2025-present: Working Singer/Songwriter ===
In 2025, Hadwin released her debut album, Little Miss Jagged. Following the release of her debut album, Courtney Hadwin and her band have been practicing, performing, and recording various live performance videos, and touring.

Members of Courtney Hadwin's Band (COURTZ)
Role	Member Name
Singer/Songwriter & Frontwoman	Courtney Hadwin
Electric Guitar (Lead)	Orlando Avalon
Keyboard & Backing Vocals	Gabrielle Ornate
Drums	Matt Townsend
Electric Guitar (Rhythm)	Mia Duckworth
Bass	Raj Bumia

== Discography ==
=== Studio albums ===
- Little Miss Jagged (2025)

=== Singles ===
- "Breakable" (2023)
- "That Girl Don't Live Here" (2023)
- "Call Me Back" (2023)
- "Monsters" (2023)
- "Christmas Rocks" (2023)
- "Jagged" (2024)
- "Spellbound" (2025)
- "You Only Love Me When I Lie" (2025)
- "D.N.A" (2025)
- "Die and Stay Pretty" (2025)

=== As featured artist ===
- 2019 Sun City Little Steven and the Disciples Of Soul with Jimmy Barnes, Peter Garrett, Sam Fender, Courtney Hadwin, Jake Clemons, Garland Jeffreys, and Bruce Springsteen.

=== Covers ===
- 2019 The Cover Sessions
- 2020 Happy Xmas (War is Over)
