= Pete Barbolak =

American football player (1926–2006)

No. 69, 89
- Position: Offensive tackle

Personal information
- Born: April 1, 1926; Chicago, Illinois, U.S.
- Died: October 22, 2006 (aged 80); Vista, California, U.S.
- Listed height: 6 ft 3 in (1.91 m)
- Listed weight: 235 lb (107 kg)

Career information
- High school: Cicero (IL) J. Sterling Morton East
- College: Purdue (1944, 1946–1948)
- NFL draft: 1948: 19th round, 172nd overall pick

Career history
- Pittsburgh Steelers (1949)

Career NFL statistics
- Games played: 10
- Stats at Pro Football Reference

Peter M. Barbolak (April 1, 1926 – October 22, 2006) was a professional American football offensive tackle in the National Football League (NFL).

He is the father of comedian Vicki Barbolak, a contestant on season 13 of America's Got Talent who finished in the top 10.
