= Making the Cut =

Making the Cut may refer to:

- Making the Cut, 1998 Irish film made for TV and featuring Gerard McSorley#TV roles
- Making the Cut: Last Man Standing, 2004 Canadian reality series featuring amateur ice hockey players
- Making the Cut (2020 TV series), American reality series presented by Heidi Klum and Tim Gunn
