= Darcy Oake =

Canadian illusionist and magician (born 1987)

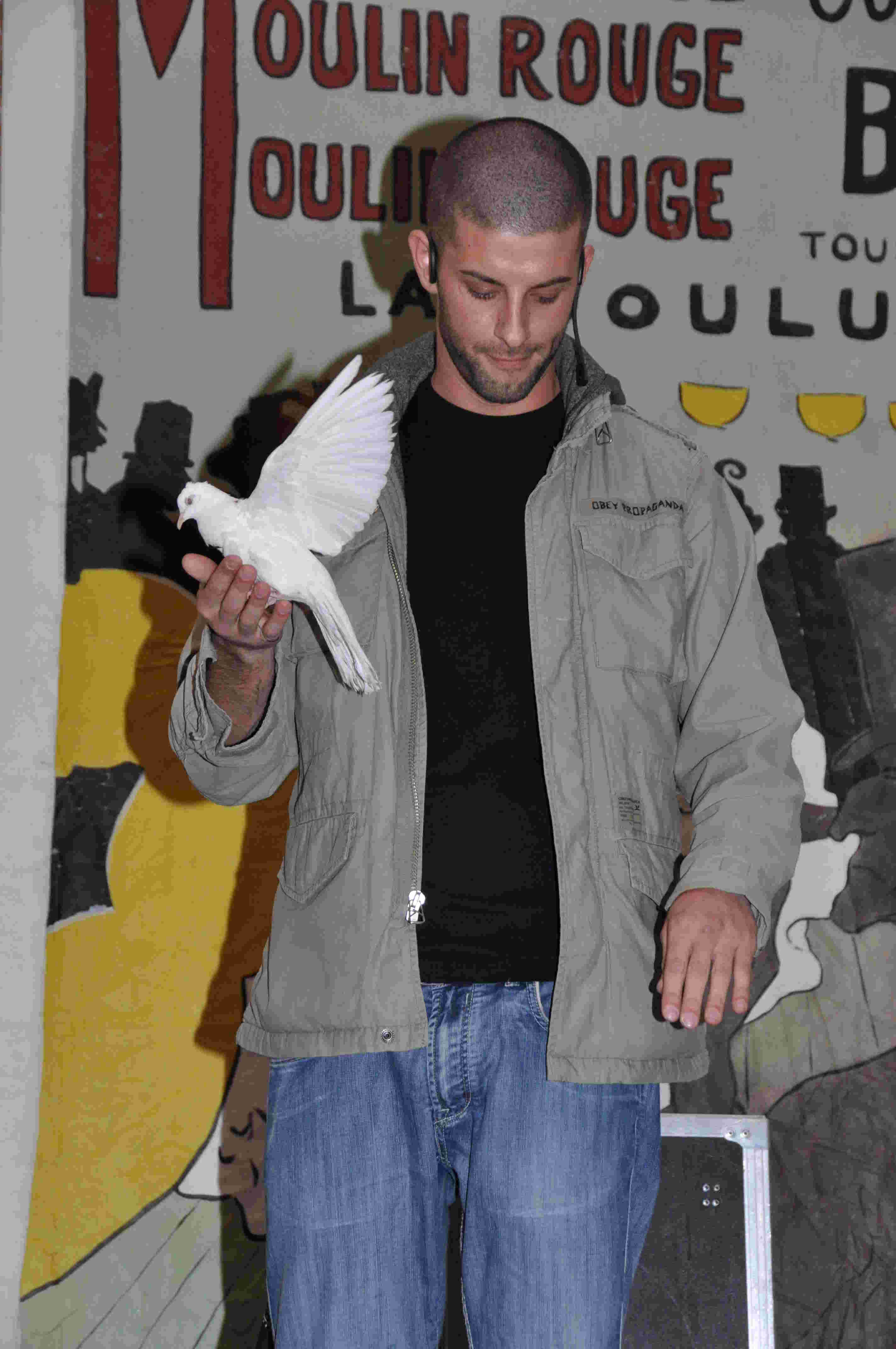
- Oake in 2010
- Born: September 27, 1987 (age 39); Winnipeg, Manitoba, Canada
- Occupation: Magician
- Years active: 2005-present
- Parent: Scott Oake (father)

Darcy Oake (born September 27, 1987) is a Canadian illusionist and magician. He gained international prominence as a finalist on the eighth series of Britain's Got Talent in 2014, where he finished in fifth place. Oake is known for his sleight-of-hand tricks and grand illusions, including his signature dove magic act that wowed both judges and audiences on the show. In 2016, he was invited to perform during Queen Elizabeth II's 90th birthday celebrations at a private event in Windsor Castle.

== Early life ==
Darcy Oake was born and raised in Winnipeg, Manitoba, Canada. He is the younger of two sons of Scott Oake, a Gemini Award-winning Hockey Night in Canada broadcaster, and his wife Anne. Oake started practicing magic tricks and performed his first shows around the age of 10.

Oake attended St. Paul's High School in Winnipeg, where he continued to develop his magic skills. At 15, he was one of six young magicians selected from across North America to compete at a Las Vegas magic convention, where he won an award for "Most Promising Magician". At age 16, Oake became the youngest person ever to win the Pacific Rim Professional Stage Challenge in Seattle.

By age 18, he had been invited to perform a 21-show run at the famed Magic Castle in Hollywood, California.

== Career ==
=== Breakthrough on Britain's Got Talent (2014) ===
Darcy Oake's international breakthrough came with his appearance on Britain's Got Talent in 2014. The act quickly went viral online, garnering millions of views, and an estimated 12 million television viewers saw the performance live in the UK. Oake's success in the early rounds led to him advancing to the live semi-finals and ultimately the finals of the competition, finishing in 5th place.

=== Television special and live tours ===
Darcy Oake soon secured opportunities for larger projects. In December 2014, ITV aired a one-hour special starring Oake, titled Darcy Oake: Edge of Reality. The special, hosted by British TV presenter Christine Bleakley, was filmed at the historic Blackpool Opera House and featured Oake performing a range of grand illusions on stage. It was broadcast on December 27, 2014.

Following the special, Oake embarked on his first major tour. In 2015, he headlined the "Edge of Reality Tour," a 12-date live tour across the United Kingdom. The tour began in September 2015 and saw Oake performing in large venues such as Sheffield City Hall and concluding with a finale at the London Eventim Apollo.

Back home in Canada, Oake also continued to perform for large crowds and corporate events. Oake has done corporate shows for clients such as Cisco, HSBC, and TD Bank. Notably, in 2018 he was a featured headliner at the Calgary Stampede, one of Canada's biggest festivals. He performed ten shows at the Stampede's Grandstand that year, entertaining over 20,000 people per night, where he was mentioned as one of the best magicians in Canada.

In addition to solo tours, Darcy Oake joined forces with other magicians in ensemble shows. He became a recurring cast member of The Illusionists, a popular touring magic production. In late 2018, Oake performed as "The Grand Illusionist" in The Illusionists – Magic of the Holidays, which ran on Broadway in New York City. In that production, he shared the stage with other internationally known illusionists including America's Got Talent champion Shin Lim and mentalist Colin Cloud.

=== Recent work and notable performances ===
In addition to live stage performances, Darcy Oake has frequently appeared on television, both as a contestant and as a guest entertainer. His notable TV appearances include:

- Britain's Got Talent (2014, ITV) – Contestant on Series 8, where he reached the finals and finished in fifth place.
- Darcy Oake: Edge of Reality (2014, ITV) – Star of his own one-off magic special broadcast on ITV on December 27, 2014. The special featured Oake performing a range of illusions at Blackpool Opera House, and was hosted by Christine Bleakley.
- Ant & Dec's Saturday Night Takeaway (2015, ITV) – Guest performer. Oake made a guest appearance on the popular variety show's "End of the Show Show" segment in March 2015, alongside hosts Ant and Dec. In that episode, he performed a grand illusion in which TV presenter Jeremy Kyle was made to disappear, delighting the live audience.
- America's Got Talent (2016, NBC) – Guest performer. Following his success on BGT, Oake was invited to perform as a special guest on America's Got Talent. In 2016 he appeared on the U.S. show and delivered an illusion that once again left the judges impressed. (He did not compete as a contestant on the regular AGT series, but was featured in a guest performance capacity.)
- Penn & Teller: Fool Us (2018, The CW) – Contestant. Oake appeared on this magician showcase program, in which performers attempt to fool veteran magicians Penn & Teller.
- Hudson & Rex (2021, Citytv) – Guest actor. Expanding beyond reality and magic shows, Oake appeared in a scripted television series in 2021. He guest-starred in an episode of the Canadian crime drama Hudson & Rex (Season 3, episode "Seeing is Deceiving") playing a magician character named Talon Dwyer who becomes involved in a mystery.

== Awards and recognition ==
- Pacific Rim Professional Stage Challenge – First Place: At age 16, Oake also took first place in the Pacific Rim Professional Stage Challenge in Seattle.
- Las Vegas World Magic Seminar – Youth Award: When he was 15, Oake competed at an international magic convention in Las Vegas (often cited in media as a youth magic seminar or convention). There, he earned an award for "Most Promising Magician".
