= Scott Oake =

Canadian sportscaster

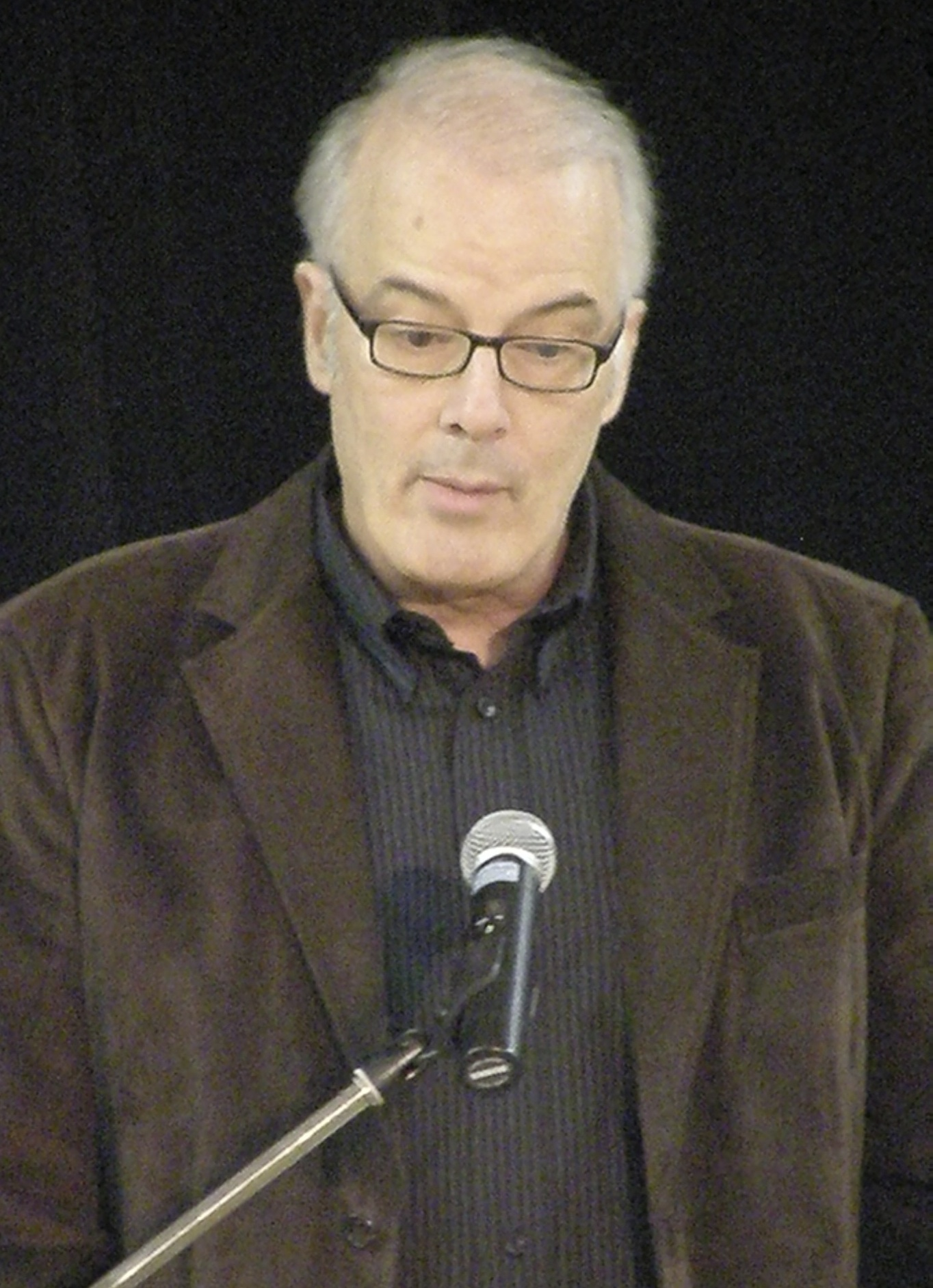
- Scott Oake pictured in 2012
- Born: 1952 or 1953; Sydney, Nova Scotia, Canada
- Education: Memorial University of Newfoundland
- Occupation: Sports broadcaster
- Employer: CBC Sports
- Spouse: Anne (m. 1980; died 2021)
- Children: 2, including Darcy
- Awards: Gemini Award (2003); Order of Manitoba (2020); Order of Canada (2024)

Scott Oake CM OM (born 1952 or 1953) is a Gemini Award-winning Canadian sportscaster for CBC Sports, Sportsnet, and Hockey Night in Canada.

== Biography ==
=== Early life ===
Oake was born in 1952 or 1953 (Note: In September 2020, Oake was reported to be 67.) in Sydney, Nova Scotia, and raised in Sydney's "Shipyards" neighbourhood until the age of 14, when his family relocated to Newfoundland. Oake's father was employed as a steelworker at Sydney Steel Corporation. As a pre-medical student at Memorial University of Newfoundland, Oake volunteered at the campus radio station, which was his introduction to broadcasting. This quickly became his passion, and he decided to pursue a career in the radio and television field.

=== Broadcasting career ===
After part-time work at CBC St. John's, he was hired full-time by the network in 1974, and has been employed by CBC to this day. Upon being hired full-time by the CBC, Oake proceeded to drop out of Memorial University in St. John's, a decision his father did not support.

Oake relocated to Winnipeg, and became the sports anchor on CBWT's 24Hours from 1979 until about 1989. From there, Oake was hired by Hockey Night in Canada, the CBC's flagship television program broadcasting National Hockey League (NHL) games to a national audience. In 1996, he was named to the roll of honour of the Manitoba Sportswriters and Sportscasters Association.

Oake is probably best known as a regular contributor to Hockey Night in Canada. Since the 2003–04 season, he has hosted the second game of HNIC's Saturday night double-headers, first alongside Kelly Hrudey, then with Marc Crawford, then with Kevin Weekes, then Hrudey again, and now with Louie DeBrusk. Even though Oake remains with the CBC after Rogers Communications, the owners of Sportsnet networks bought the sole national rights for the 2014–15 season, Oake was with the Sportsnet's national NHL coverage from June 2014, until retiring after the 2025–26 season.

Along with hockey, he has covered many important sporting events including the Olympics, Commonwealth Games, CFL football, and many other sports. He won the 2003 "Best Host or Interviewer in a Sports Program or Sportscast" Gemini Award. In 2004, he hosted the hockey docudrama Making the Cut.

=== Olympic coverage ===
During his career, Oake has covered a total of 12 Olympic games for the CBC, including the 2008 Beijing Games where he did play-by-play for flatwater canoeing and rowing events. Oake has covered downhill skiing at every Winter Olympics from Calgary in 1988 to Sochi in 2014.

=== Personal life ===
Oake currently lives in Winnipeg, Manitoba. He was married to Anne on May 31, 1980, and has a son, Darcy, who is an illusionist. Darcy appeared in the 2014 edition of Britain's Got Talent, advancing to the semi-finals and final, but he lost the competition to the singing group Collabro. Their first son Bruce died on March 28, 2011, at the age of 25 of a drug overdose, and they later named a recovery centre after him in Winnipeg called the Bruce Oake Recovery Centre. His wife, Anne, died on September 6, 2021, from an autoimmune liver condition.

Oake was appointed a Member of the Order of Manitoba in September 2020. In December 2024, he was appointed a Member to the Order of Canada.
