= Vicki Barbolak =

American comedian

- Born: Freeport, Illinois, U.S.
- Occupations: comedian; speaker
- Known for: Founder of Wedding Chapel to Go

Vicki Barbolak is an American comedian, speaker, and founder of Wedding Chapel to Go. Barbolak was a top 10 finalist on season 13 of America's Got Talent.

== Early life ==
Vicki Barbolak was born in Freeport, Illinois. Her mother was a secretary and her father, Pete Barbolak, a former National Football League player, worked in Chicago for the Federal Bureau of Investigation.

== Career ==
At the age of 38, Barbolak saw an ad for a stand-up comedy class and decided to attend. She quickly realized that making people laugh brought her more happiness and joy than she thought was possible. After a few years of doing open mic, Barbolak was noticed by Mitzi Shore, owner of The Comedy Store, where she further developed her craft. In 2018, she was a contestant in season 13 of America's Got Talent, where she finished as a finalist. In 2019, she began her "Trailer Nasty Tour." She competed in season one of America's Got Talent: The Champions but was eliminated during the first week of the competition. She also competed in Britain's Got Talent: The Champions but was eliminated during the fifth week of the competition.

Barbolak is an ordained minister. She is the founder of Wedding Chapel to Go. She is also a speaker at conferences and organizations where she discusses humor in the workplace.

== Personal life ==
Barbolak has lived in a trailer for over 25 years. She is married to Lou Brockman, a piano player at the Comedy Store where they met. She has 2 daughters. She has 5 grandchildren. She lives in Rancho Caleveras Mobile Home Park in Oceanside, California.
