= Colin Cloud =

Scottish stage mentalist (born 1987)

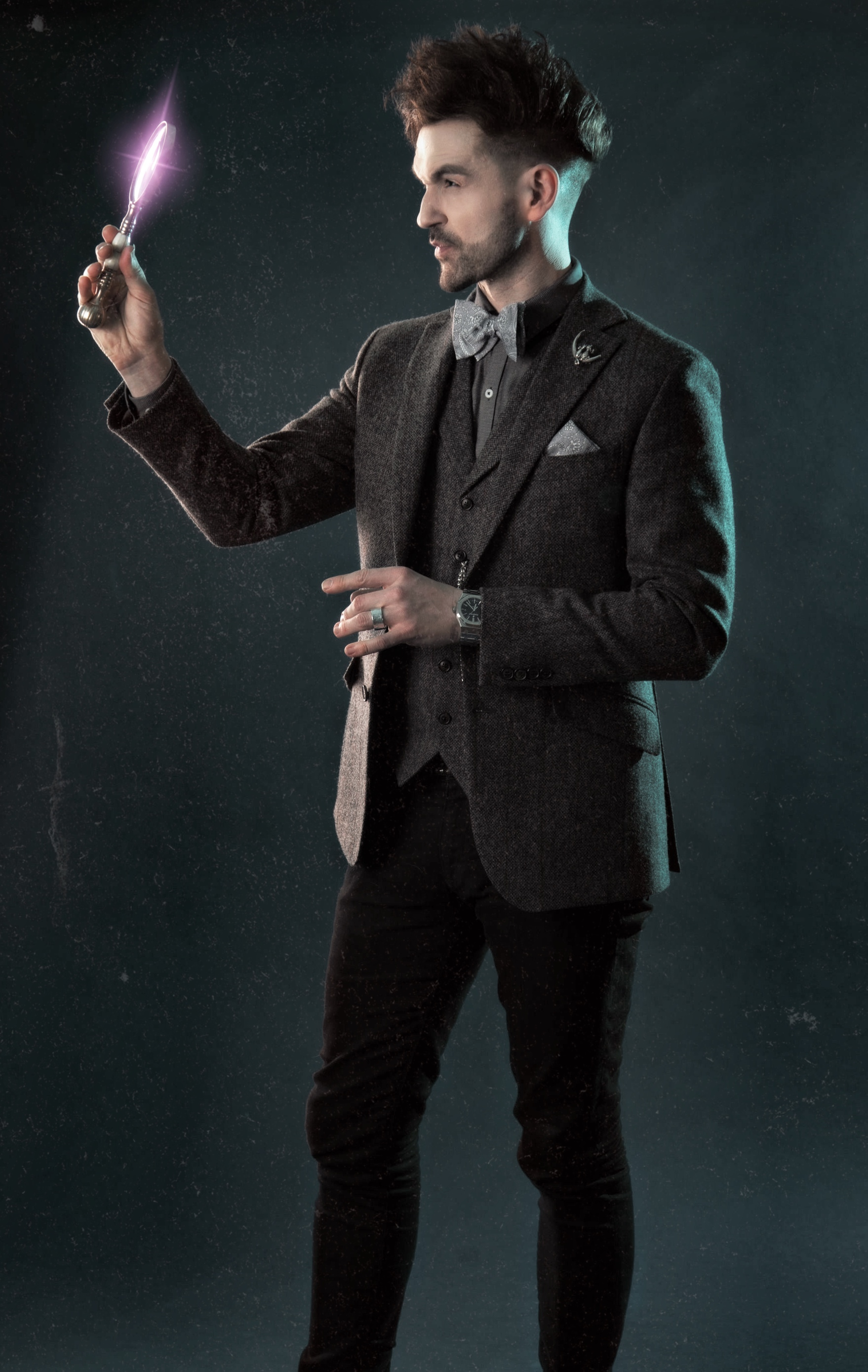
- Cloud in 2023
- Born: Colin McLeod; 9 January 1987 (age 39); Harthill, Scotland, United Kingdom
- Occupations: Mentalist; speaker
- Years active: 2008–present
- Website: colincloud.com

Colin McLeod, known professionally as Colin Cloud, is a Scottish stage mentalist from Harthill, Scotland, who describes himself as The Real Life Sherlock Holmes. In 2017 he appeared as a semi-finalist on season 12 of America's Got Talent.

== Personal life ==
Cloud was born on 9 January 1987 in Harthill, Scotland. In a 2015 interview with stv Glasgow, Cloud says that he was shy and quiet at school, and that he studied forensic investigation at university. He has stated that he has been inspired by Arthur Conan Doyle's fictional detective, Sherlock Holmes, and the detective's ability to read people.

Cloud began his career by studying a Bachelor of Science (Honours) in forensic investigation, specializing in criminal profiling, at Glasgow Caledonian University (2003-2007) before abandoning that line following an interview with Calum Laurie to pursue a career in entertainment.

== Early career ==
Cloud joined Tree of Knowledge as a speaker in 2007. He left the company in 2013 to concentrate on developing a TV and stage career.

Under the name Colin McLeod, Cloud appeared as a contestant on Penn & Teller: Fool Us, where he failed to fool the judges.

In 2012, he appeared on Britain's Got Talent with positive reviews from the four judges. However, McLeod failed to make it through to the live semi-finals.

In 2012, Cloud performed at the Edinburgh International Magic Festival.

== Career ==
Cloud performs both public and private shows. He has taken shows to the Edinburgh Festival Fringe in 2014 to 2016.

In June 2015, Cloud joined the touring magic show, The Illusionists as "The Deductionist".

=== TV and radio ===
In 2014, in collaboration with Don Jack, the partnership Prestige was established. Since then, Cloud has appeared as a guest on Michael McIntyre's Big Show, Loose Women, Steve Wright and The One Show among other TV and radio performances internationally. With the team of BBC's Sherlock - they worked with series creator Mark Gatiss creating support material for the Sherlock Christmas Special. In 2017, Cloud was a contestant on season 12 of America's Got Talent and reached the semi-finals. He later made an appearance on the Royal Variety Performance. In 2019, Cloud participated in the first season of America's Got Talent: The Champions, where he was eliminated in the preliminary round. He made an appearance as a guest performer alongside season 13 winner, Shin Lim, in the season two finale on 17 February 2020. In 2024 he appeared in series 17 of Britain's Got Talent as part of Magicians Assemble, alongside Elizabeth Best, Ben Hart, and Aidan McCann.

=== Stage shows ===
- 2011: It's All in the Mind.
- 2012: Britain's Got Talent (series 6)
- 2014: The Colour Ham
- 2014: Colin Cloud Forensic Mind Reader
- 2015: Wild Cabaret (Glasgow)
- 2015: Colin Cloud Kills
- 2016: Colin Cloud: Exposé
- 2017: Dare
- 2017: The Illusionists Live
- 2017: America's Got Talent
- 2017: Royal Variety Performance
- 2019: America's Got Talent: The Champions
- 2024: Britain's Got Talent (series 17)
- 2024: Colin Cloud: Mastermind
