= Ta na manga =

Portuguese magician duo

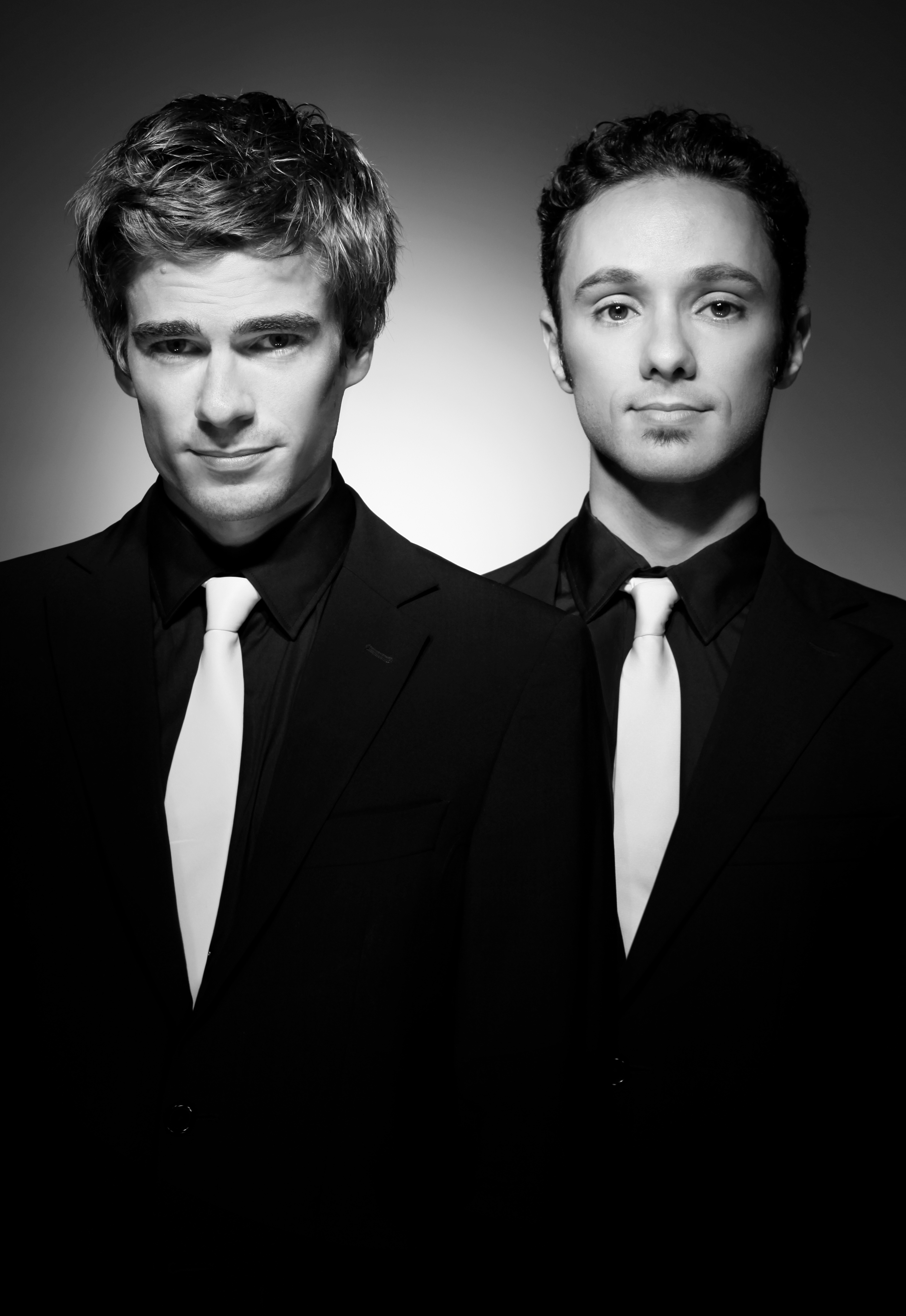
- Pedro Teixeira (left) and Gonçalo Jorge (right)
- Occupation: Magicians
- Years active: 2004–present
- Website: www.tanamanga.com

Ta na manga is a Portuguese magic duo formed by Gonçalo Jorge and Pedro Teixeira.

Throughout their career, they have received numerous international magic awards, including a prize at the FISM World Championship of Magic and the Mandrake d'Or in Paris. Their work combines magic, theatre and music and has been presented across five continents, including performances at the Magic Castle in Hollywood and on the French television programme Le Plus Grand Cabaret du Monde.

== Career ==
=== Formation and early years ===
Gonçalo Jorge and Pedro Teixeira met at the Associação Portuguesa de Ilusionismo (API; Portuguese Association of Magic), where they initially took part individually in magic competitions. Their friendship led them to develop ideas and acts together, and in 2004 they formed Ta na manga.

In June 2008, they debuted their first show, Tá na manga ao quadrado ("Ta na manga squared"), at the Sociedade de Instrução Guilherme Cossoul in Lisbon. Two years later, they premiered Magia e etc. (não necessariamente nesta ordem) ("Magic and etcetera, not necessarily in that order") at Teatro da Comuna in Lisbon. The show was later presented at the Solrir comedy festival at Portimão Arena in 2013.

=== International career ===
In 2009, Ta na manga began competing internationally. In September, they won first prize in General Magic at the French Magic Championship, organized by the Fédération Française des Artistes Prestidigitateurs (FFAP) during its 43rd congress in Vannes. They received further awards that year in Belgium and Italy.

In 2010, they received an award at the XXX Congreso Mágico Nacional de España in A Coruña and received the audience award, the Premio Páginas, at the Memorial Frakson in Madrid.

In 2011, they won the British Ring Shield, first prize in the stage magic competition at the annual British Ring convention of the International Brotherhood of Magicians, held in Southport, England. In October of the same year, they received the Mandrake d'Or at the Théâtre des Bouffes-Parisiens in Paris.

Ta na manga receiving third prize in General Magic at the 2012 FISM World Championship of Magic.

In July 2012, they competed at the FISM World Championship of Magic in Blackpool, England, where they received third prize in General Magic, becoming the first Portuguese representatives to receive an award in that category.

Alongside their competition career, they developed an international career as guest performers at magic festivals and other events. In July 2011, they performed at the Magic Castle in Hollywood during a week devoted to Portuguese magic organized by the Academy of Magical Arts. In 2013, they appeared on the 150th edition of the French television programme Le Plus Grand Cabaret du Monde, presented by Patrick Sébastien and broadcast on France 2 and TV5Monde.

Their international appearances in subsequent years included the centenary gala of the Magischer Zirkel von Deutschland in Germany, the Edinburgh International Magic Festival in Scotland, the TMA Magic Convention in Taiwan, Magic in Rio in Brazil, Masters of Magic in Italy, the Busan International Magic Festival in South Korea, and the Journées de la Magie Universelle in Algeria.

The duo have also been involved in academic activities concerning magic as an art form. In 2014, Gonçalo Jorge and Pedro Teixeira were guest speakers on the magic programme at the School of Dance and Circus (DOCH), part of the Stockholm University of the Arts, in Stockholm. The following year, they gave a lecture entitled A Magia como forma de arte ("Magic as an art form") at the Faculty of Letters of the University of Lisbon, discussing their approach to magic as a performing art.

In 2017, they returned to Blackpool as guest performers at the 65th Blackpool Magic Convention, which hosted the FISM European Championship of Magic that year. Later that year, they appeared on Luís de Matos – Impossível, a live television programme presented by Luís de Matos and broadcast by RTP1.

In December 2018, they joined the original cast of the stage production Luís de Matos Impossível ao Vivo at the Teatro Tivoli BBVA in Lisbon, where the show ran until 1 January 2019. They returned to the production in 2024 for a brief special appearance at the same theatre.

In July 2022, ten years after receiving their prize at the World Championship of Magic, they returned to the FISM World Championship at the Centre des congrès de Québec in Canada, this time as guest performers.

== Artistic work ==
Ta na manga performing at the Auditorio Ciudad de León in 2019.

Ta na manga's work is characterized by a theatrical approach to magic, with particular emphasis on staging and narrative and on the integration of music into their performances.

One expression of this approach is Inspirato, the act for which they received a prize at the 2012 FISM World Championship. Ouest-France described the act as a work of theatrical magic centred on a magician and his search for inspiration.

The theatrical and artistic character of the duo's work has been noted by critics. In 2013, All Edinburgh Theatre highlighted the theatricality of one of their acts, describing their magic as "intriguing" and displaying "sophisticated elegance". In 2018, La Nouvelle République described them as "véritables poètes inspirés" ("true inspired poets"). In 2020, El País described two of their acts as exercises in scenic poetry and as examples of the renewal of the magic repertoire through the introduction of new concepts, narratives and perspectives.

The duo's emphasis on dramaturgy and staging has also been discussed in relation to some of the ideas associated with Magie Nouvelle, a contemporary artistic movement that emerged in France in the early 2000s and explores magic as an artistic language in dialogue with other performing arts.

== Awards and honours ==
- 2009: Club Magico Italiano (CMI) — 3rd Prize in Stage Magic, Abano Terme, Italy
- 2009: Royal Club des Magiciens de Bruxelles (RCMB) — 1st Prize in General Magic, Brussels, Belgium
- 2009: Fédération Française des Artistes Prestidigitateurs — 1st Prize in General Magic, Vannes, France
- 2010: Memorial Frakson — Audience Award (Premio Páginas), Madrid, Spain
- 2010: Sociedad Española de Ilusionismo (SEI) — 2nd Prize in General Magic, XXX Congreso Mágico Nacional, A Coruña, Spain
- 2010: Premi Especial de Màgia General — XXX Congreso Mágico Nacional, A Coruña, Spain
- 2010: MagicValongo — 2nd Prize in Stage Magic, 19th International Magic Festival, Valongo, Portugal
- 2011: API Trophy — API Convention 2011, Rio Maior, Portugal
- 2011: Mandrake d'Or — 22e Festival des Mandrakes d'Or, Paris, France
- 2011: International Brotherhood of Magicians British Ring — 1st Prize in Stage Magic (British Ring Shield), Southport, United Kingdom
- 2012: FISM World Championship of Magic — 3rd Prize in General Magic, Blackpool, United Kingdom
- 2016: Trophée des Dauphins Magiques — 11e Festival International de Magie, Andrézieux-Bouthéon, France
- 2020: Honorary members of Associação Portuguesa de Ilusionismo — Lisbon, Portugal
- 2022: Trophée des Dauphins Magiques — 14e Festival International de Magie, Andrézieux-Bouthéon, France
