= Michael C. Anthony =

American magician

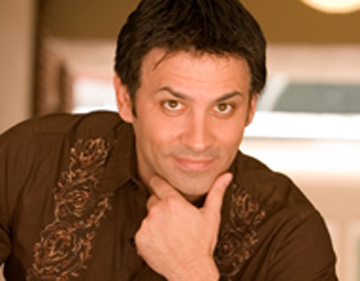
- Born: Michael Anthony Caruso
- Occupations: Hypnotist, Speaker, Author
- Years active: 1994-present
- Website: michaelcanthony.com

Michael C. Anthony (born Michael Anthony Caruso) is an American stage hypnotist, best selling author, and body language expert. Michael has toured with his show Hypnotized Live since 1994. He also travels with the worldwide tour The Illusionists Live from Broadway playing the role of “The Hypnotist.”

== Background ==
Michael is the son of Joseph Caruso born in New York City, New York and Anne Doherty born in Thorold, Ontario, Canada. He is also the great nephew of Stage Hypnotist and Magician Joe Lamonia (also known as Buffalo Joe). Michael currently resides in Tampa, Florida.

Michael is a kidney transplant recipient since Dec 1, 2011. The transplant was part of a research program at Northwestern Memorial Hospital in Chicago, where a double kidney/stem cell procedure (donated by his brother Joe Caruso) was followed. He is one of a small handful of people in the world living with a transplanted organ, but does not require immunosuppressive medication.

== Early career ==
Michael got his early start as a magician, performing in restaurants and corporate shows. Fans started calling Michael "The Great Caruso" which was the nickname of famous opera singer Enrico Caruso Michael didn't want to associate with the confusion of being branded "The Great Caruso 2", so he substituted his middle name (Anthony) for his last, and rearranged the "C" for Caruso as his middle name.

== Touring ==
Michael started performing in colleges across America and has been named Male Entertainer of the Year with Campus Activities Magazine and nominated several times as recently as 2016 He also performs as The Hypnotist in the largest grossing Magic Show in the world called The Illusionists, Live from Broadway and is the star of Hypnotized Live, a performing arts show.

== Author and public speaking ==
Michael is also an Amazon Best Selling Author and popular corporate speaker. His book, Body Language Secrets, How to Read Minds by Reading Bodies has been received well by online reviewers. In the corporate world, Michael trains sales professionals with his keynote “Shut Up & Sell with your Body."

Michael is a regular on Daytime WFLA in Tampa as a Body Language Expert.
