= Mark Kalin and Jinger =

American magicians duo

Mark Kalin and Jinger Leigh are an American magic couple known for large-scale stage shows and for appearances on network television specials.

Jinger is both an on-stage and business partner to husband Kalin. In 1997, they formed Supreme Entertainment Productions and produced Before Your Very Eyes, a themed revue that played at Trump's Marina in Atlantic City, New Jersey. In 1999, together with comedy magician Jeff Hobson, they staged the magic-illusion show Carnival of Wonders. The show won awards and prompted Magic Magazine to draw comparisons with Le Roy, Talma & Bosco.

In 2001, Kalin & Jinger purchased the remaining company interest in Supreme Entertainment and formed a new company, Majikal Productions, employing the talents of magician and former David Copperfield choreographer Joanie Spina and leading illusion designer Jim Steinmeyer. Their first venture under the new company name was Illusionarium at the Reno Hilton, in Reno, Nevada. Their current projects include Magic Underground, a dedicated magic venue in Reno.

Kalin and Jinger have made numerous television appearances. They featured in the Gary Ouellet-produced World's Greatest Magic II in 1995 and NBC's Hidden Secrets of Magic in 1996. On the 1998 network special The World's Most Dangerous Magic, Kalin & Jinger performed the "Table of Terror" (a "Table of Death" style escape).

== Awards ==
In 1998 Kalin & Jinger were voted Magicians of the Year by the Academy of Magical Arts for 1997. Other recipients include David Copperfield, Doug Henning, David Blaine, Lance Burton, Criss Angel and Penn & Teller.
