= Fabien Olicard =

French mentalist

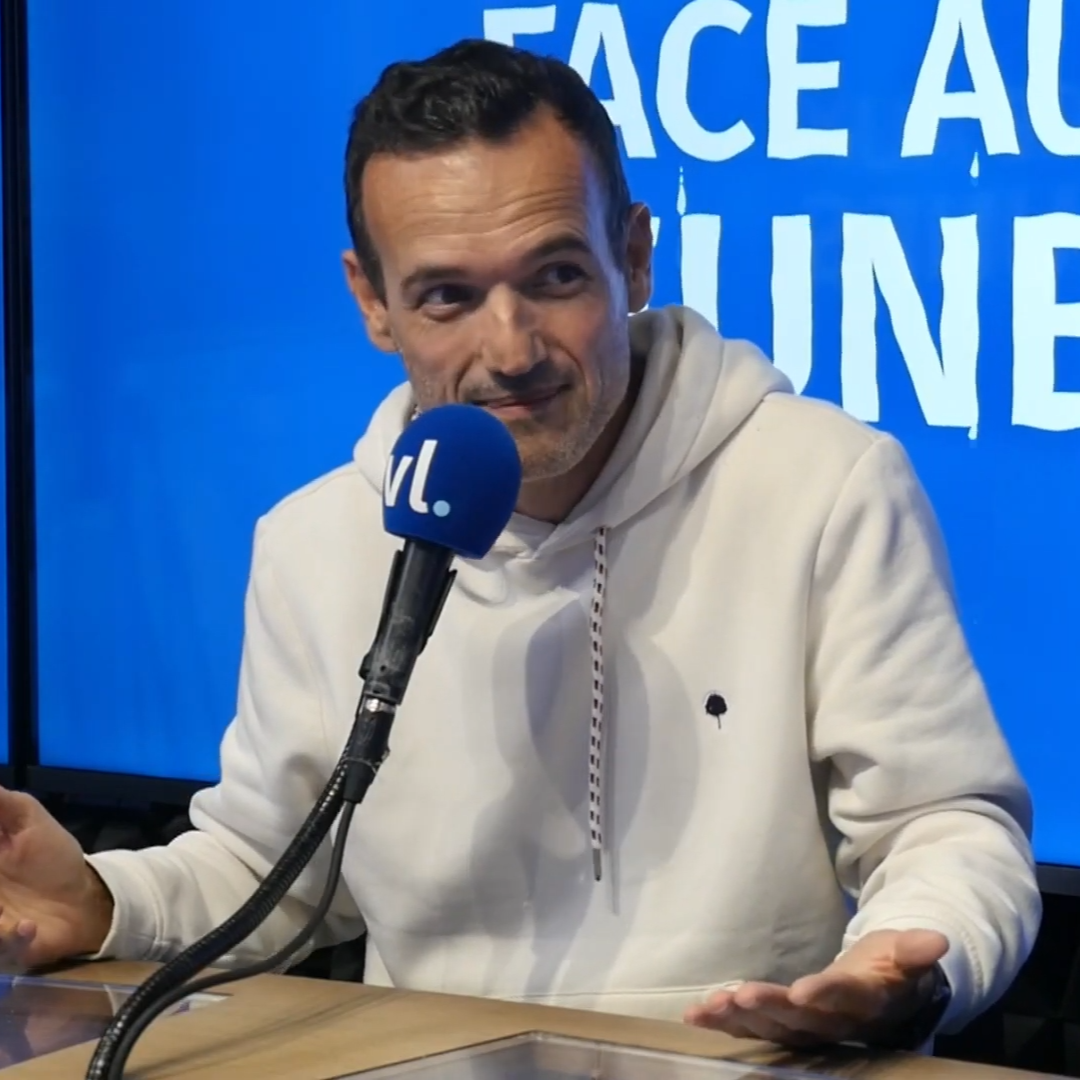
- Born: November 22, 1982 (age 44); La Rochelle

YouTube information
- Channel: FabienOlicard
- Genre: Mentalism
- Subscribers: 2.32 million
- Last updated: June 2026
- Website: www.fabienolicard.fr

Fabien Olicard, born November 22, 1982, in La Rochelle, is a French mentalist, humorist and web videographer. Known for his memorization techniques and his humor, he has been performing in shows since 2011. He published videos on YouTube and has performed in major French venues such as the Zénith de Paris and the Olympia. He has written several books on psychology, the brain and memory.

== Biography ==
Fabien Olicard is the third child of Marcel Olicard and Cathy Picoron. He spent his childhood in Marsilly. At 7 or 8 years old, an IQ test revealed that he had an eidetic memory (almost photographic). It was also at this age that he began to become passionate about illusionism after buying the book Cours Magica by Robert Veno in a garage sale.

after repeating his first year of high school (seconde), Fabien Olicard began pursuing a science baccalaureate which he did not obtain and stopped his studies. He devoted himself to illusionism and specialized, in the mid-2000s, in mentalism. He exercised his memory as a waiter in a restaurant. In 2007, he presented himself at the Golden Cannes and won the 1st prize in the category close-up. Spotted by a producer, he worked on the humor festival of Saint-Martin.

Until 2011, he performed in his native region, his shows remained confidential. The Comédie des 3 Bornes allows him to perform in Paris. He stayed there for two years before playing his show every Tuesday at the Théâtre du Point-Virgule then at the Grand Point-Virgule. His show is a series of demonstrations of mentalism, neurosciences and nonverbal communication techniques, such as cold reading, prosody, graphology and synergology. He enjoyed success there, helped by the television broadcast in France of the American series Mentalist which popularized "mental magic".

After launching his YouTube channel, Fabien Olicard gained more than 200,000 subscribers throughout 2016.

This online success allowed him to multiply his media appearances such as in the show C'est que de la télé on C8 or Vivement dimanche dimanche. Columnist for the program Antidote on France 2, he took part in a special evening broadcast on the channel in September 2021 titled Voyage au cœur de la mémoire. He also participated in several episodes of the show E=M6 broadcast on M6 and gave several TED talks. In 2018, he created his new show Singularité which he performed at the Olympia in Paris, at the Eiffel Tower theater and at La Seine musicale. Among his tricks, he managed to guess the first name or astrological sign of a stranger, deduced the color of a card from micro-expressions and had the public memorize the first decimals of pi.

He has written books and published board games centered around magic and mentalism, In 2020, he launched a monthly magazine called Curiouz and a podcast called "L'hippocampe".

On March 15, 2023, he became a member of the show Les Grosses Têtes hosted by Laurent Ruquier.

== Publications ==
=== Books ===
- Votre cerveau est extraordinaire. First édition. 18 May 2017. p. 160. ISBN 978-2412022917..
- Votre cerveau est définitivement extraordinaire !. First. 16 May 2018. p. 144. ISBN 978-2412035474..
- Votre temps est infini. First. 3 October 2019. p. 252. ISBN 978-2412049402..
- Le bonheur est caché dans un coin de votre cerveau. First. 24 September 2020. p. 240. ISBN 978-2412060230..
- L'antiguide de la manipulation. First. 12 May 2021. p. 240. ISBN 978-2412068465..
- avec Michel Cymes (12 May 2022). Mémoire : vous avez le pouvoir !. First et Solar. p. 240. ISBN 978-2263179365..
- Votre idée va devenir une réalité. First. 4 May 2023. p. 216. ISBN 978-2412088371..

=== Shows ===
- 2014: Mots de tête
- 2016: Fabien Olicard vous mentalise
- 2017: Mental rodage
- 2018: Singularité
- 2022: Archétypes

=== Board Games ===
- Céline Holynski (24 October 2018). La Memory box. Larousse. p. 64. ISBN 978-2035960054..
- Mon coffret mentaliste. Dragon D'Or. 15 October 2020. p. 26. ISBN 978-2821212503..

== Awards and honors ==
- Magic Prize at KDOR du Cabaret (sponsored by Patrick Sébastien)
- 1st prize at the Speed Dating Humor (Poitiers)
- Honorary Prize of the Magic Festival (La Rochelle)
- 4th prize at the Crystal Lions (Luxembourg)
- 1st prize at Cannes d'Or (Cannes)
- 2012: Public & Jury Prize at the Parisian final of the Train des talents
- 2012: IDTGV Prize - Train des Talents, Grand National Final at the Palais des Glaces
- 2012: Mandrake d'Or (Paris Première), program "The greatest magicians of the world"
- 2013: Jury Prize at the "La Machine à Rire" festival
- 2014: 4e au concours de l'Ordre européen des Mentalistes (1er du classement français)
- 2014: 1st prize at the festival "The Stars of magic and the stars of the circus"
- 2015-2016: Voted Magic Show of the Year by the F.F.A.P.
- 2016: Jury for the French Magic Championships (Paris Première)

== Appendices ==
=== Audiography ===
- [audio] Fabien Olicard, from the Savoyard restaurant in La Rochelle to mentalism at Drucker, Success Stories, 69 minutes, podcast by Fabrice Florent, September 23, 2019, (listen online).
- [audio] The underside of Fabien Olicard's "empire", Success Stories, 59 minutes, podcast by Fabrice Florent, September 23, 2019, (listen online).

=== External links ===
- VIAF
- ISNI
- BnF (données)
- Sudoc
- GND
- Pologne
- NUKAT
- Catalogne
- Tchéquie
- WorldCat
