= Making the Cut: Last Man Standing =

- Presented by: Scott Oake
- Opening theme: "Big League" - season 1; "Get Thru This" - season 2
- Country of origin: Canada
- No. of seasons: 2

Original release
- Network: CBC Television; Global Television Network
- Release: 2004

Making the Cut is a Canadian reality television series that follows a group of amateur ice hockey players through a rigorous training session.

The first season was broadcast on CBC Television in 2004. In 2006, the second season was moved to Global where its name was expanded to Making the Cut: Last Man Standing.

== Season 1 ==
In the first season, 68 players participated in a grueling two-week training camp in Vernon, British Columbia to compete for one of six invitations to an NHL training camp, one for each Canadian team. Those 68 players were divided into two teams, "Team Blue" and "Team Gold". Former NHL coaches Mike Keenan and Scotty Bowman served as General Managers for this season, alongside a team of other hockey scouts and coaches. Scott Oake served as the host for this season.

The song "Big League" by Canadian rock musician Tom Cochrane was the theme song for the first season of the show.

The winners of that season were as follows:

Player	Hometown	NHL team
Jordan Little	Winnipeg, Manitoba	Edmonton Oilers
James Demone	St. Albert, Alberta	Vancouver Canucks
Mike Mole	Moncton, New Brunswick	Ottawa Senators
Matt Hubbauer	Winnipeg, Manitoba	Calgary Flames
Kevin Lavallée	Montreal, Quebec	Montreal Canadiens
Dominic Noël	Lamèque, New Brunswick	Toronto Maple Leafs

== Season 2 ==
In the second season, one winner received a $250,000 endorsement contract and representation from a top NHL agent.

During the second season, Mike Keenan returned as the lone General Manager of the series.

Franklin MacDonald of Nova Scotia was the winner of that season, and earned a contract with the Florida Panthers of the National Hockey League, playing three seasons with their American Hockey League affiliate at the time, the Rochester Americans. As of 2013, he was playing for EHC Black Wings Linz of the Austrian Hockey League.

David Brine became the first contestant from the series to make the NHL when he made his debut with the Panthers on February 2, 2008 against the Tampa Bay Lightning.

The song "Get Thru This" by Vancouver rock band Art of Dying was the theme song for the second season of the show.
