= America's Got Talent season 13 =

America's Got Talent
- Season 13
- Promotional poster for season 13, featuring (L to R) judges Mandel, Mel B, Cowell, Klum, and host Banks
- Showrunners: Jason Raff; Sam Donnelly
- Hosted by: Tyra Banks
- Judges: Howie Mandel; Mel B; Heidi Klum; Simon Cowell
- Winner: Shin Lim
- Runner-up: Zurcaroh
- Finals venue: Dolby Theatre
- No. of episodes: 24

Release
- Original network: NBC
- Original release: May 29 – September 19, 2018

Season chronology
- ← Previous; Season 12 Next → Season 14

Judges and Host for America's Got Talent Season 13

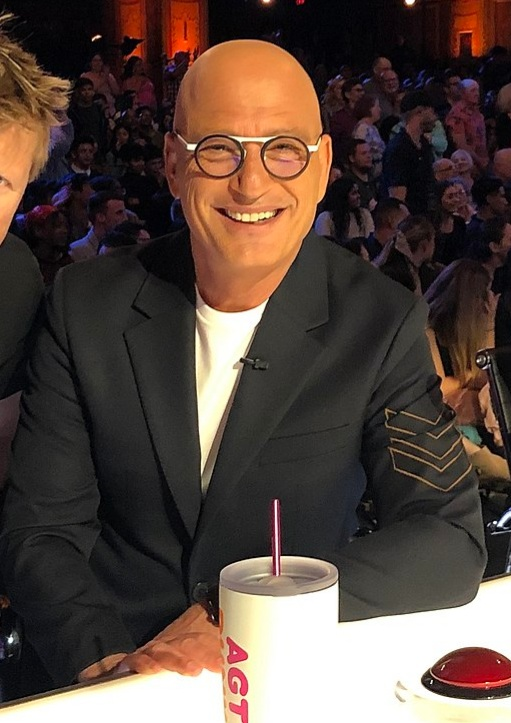
Howie Mandel

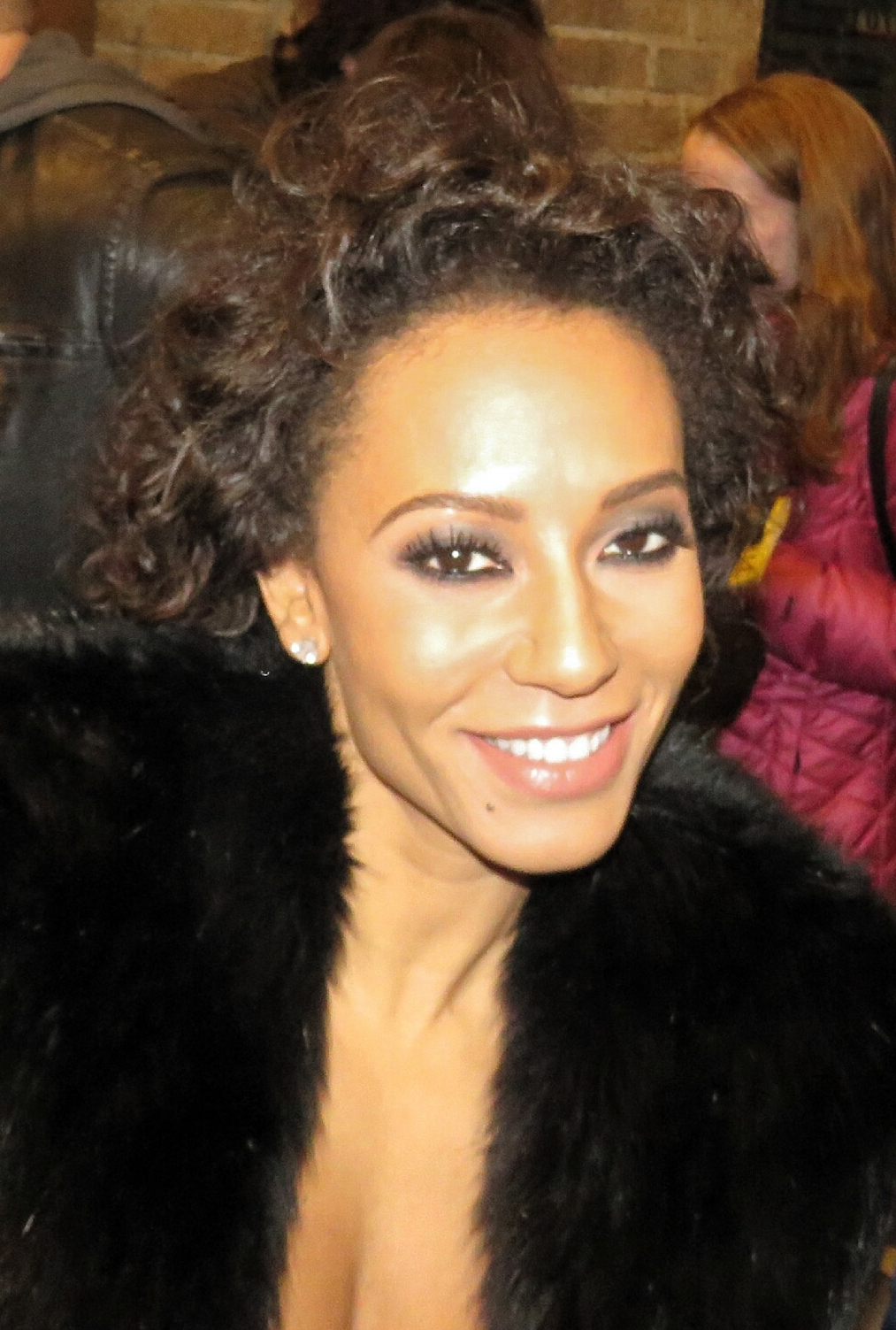
Mel B

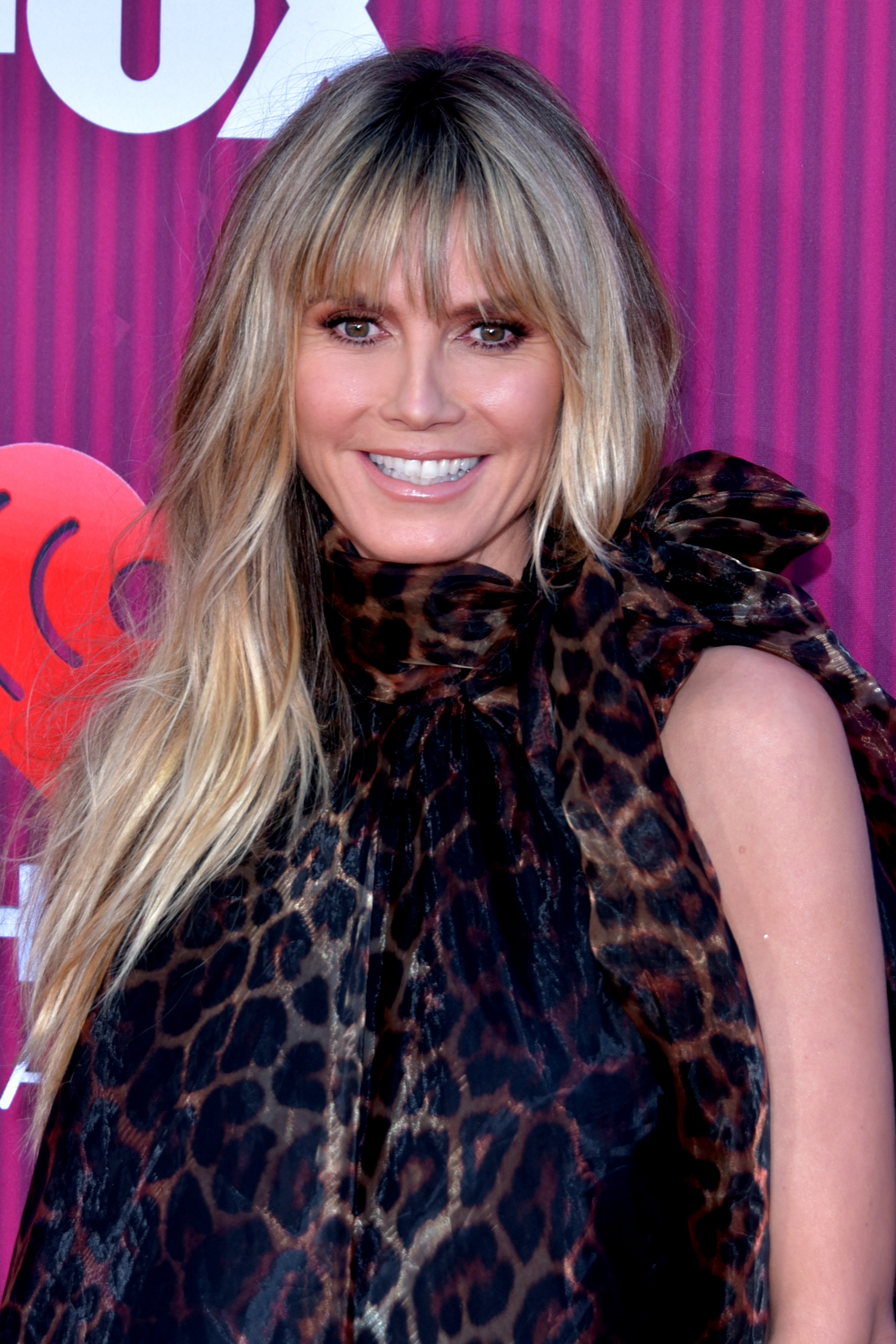
Heidi Klum

Simon Cowell

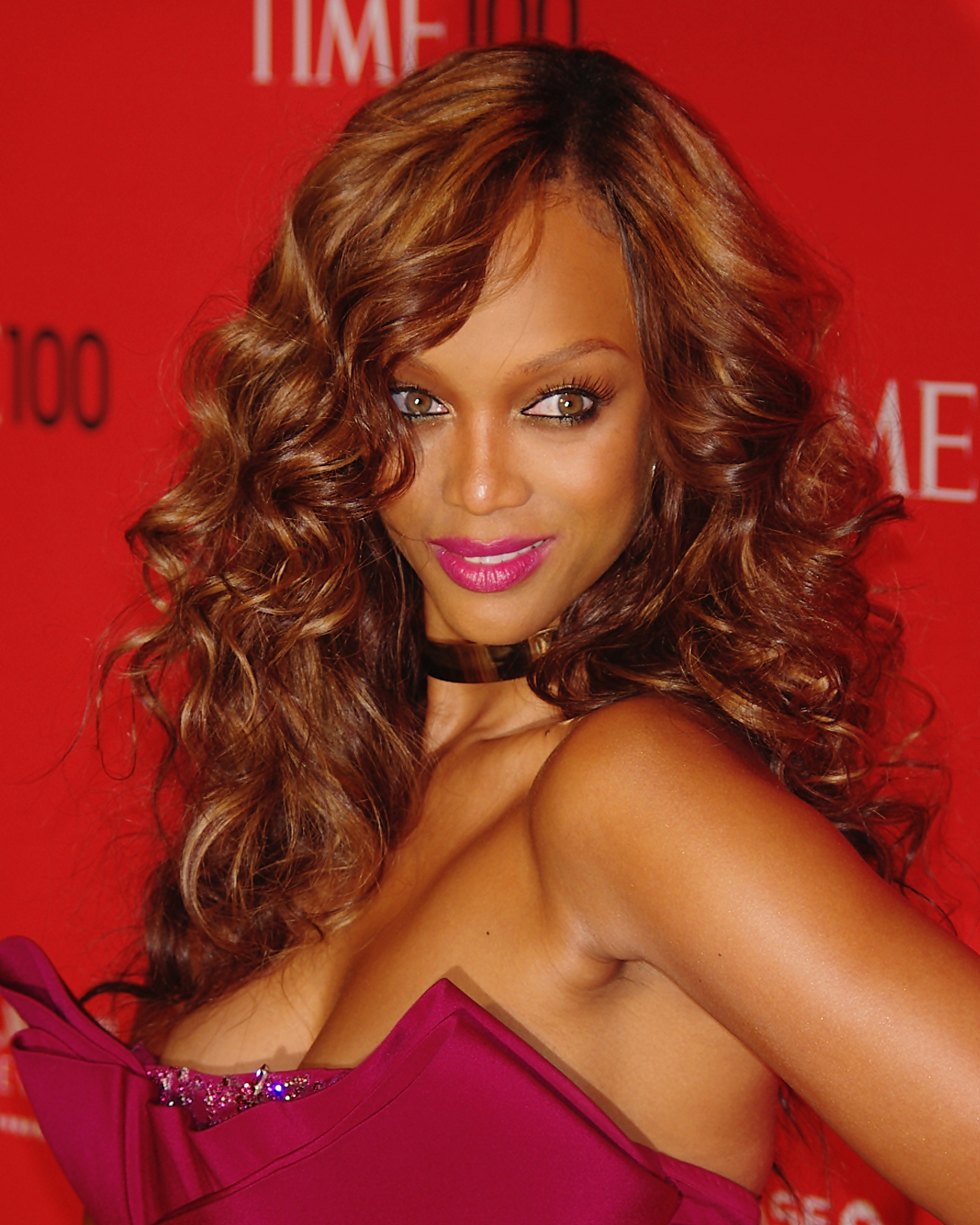
Tyra Banks

The thirteenth season of American talent show competition series America's Got Talent was broadcast on NBC from May 29 to September 19, 2018. There were no major changes to the program during the season; the guest judges for this season's Judge Cuts episodes were Ken Jeong, Olivia Munn, Martina McBride, and Chris Hardwick.

The thirteenth season was won by close-up magician Shin Lim, with acrobatic group Zurcaroh finishing second, and electric violinist Brian King Joseph placing third. During its broadcast, the season averaged around 11.15 million viewers.

== Season overview ==
Open auditions were held in late 2017 within Orlando, Cincinnati, Savannah, Milwaukee, Houston, Las Vegas, New York City, Nashville, and Los Angeles (while online auditions were accepted). As in previous years, the judges' auditions were held and filmed in March 2018 at the Pasadena Civic Auditorium in Los Angeles. The Judge Cuts episodes included actor Ken Jeong, actress Olivia Munn, singer Martina McBride, and comedian Chris Hardwick appearing as guest judges.

Thirty-six of the participants auditioning secured a place in the live quarter-finals, with twelve quarter-finalists appearing in each of the shows. Among the contestants: acrobatic group Zurcaroh, singer Michael Ketterer, singer Courtney Hadwin, singer Amanda Mena, and singer Makayla Phillips who had each received a golden buzzer from the main judges and host; choir Voices of Hope, choir Angel City Chorale, ballroom dancers Quin and Misha, and rapper Flau'jae who had each received a Golden Buzzer from the guest judges; opera singer Daniel Emmet, novelty water-spitting act Human Fountains, and multimedia performance group Front Pictures who were chosen as Wildcard quarter-finalists. Twenty-two quarter-finalists advanced and appeared in two semi-finals (eleven in each show), including Front Pictures which was chosen again by the judges (as the Wildcard semi-finalist); ten semi-finalists securing a place in the finals. The chart below lists the results of each participant's overall performance in this season:

Winner | Runner-up | Third place | Finalist | Semi-finalist
Quarter-finalist | Wildcard Quarter-finalist | Wildcard Semi-finalist
Golden Buzzer - Auditions | Golden Buzzer - Judge Cuts

Participant	Age(s) ^{1}	Genre	Act	From	Quarter-Final	Result
Aaron Crow	49	Danger	Danger Act	Bruges, Belgium	3	Semi-finalist
Amanda Mena	16	Singing	Singer	Boston	1	Semi-finalist
Angel City Chorale	19-88	Singing	Choir	Los Angeles	1	Semi-finalist
Brian King Joseph	27	Music	Electric Violinist	Los Angeles	3	Third place
Christina Wells	42	Singing	Singer	Houston	3	Semi-finalist
Courtney Hadwin	14	Singing	Singer	Peterlee, England	1	Finalist
Da RepubliK	15-32	Dance	Dance Group	Santo Domingo, Dominican Republic	2	Semi-finalist
Daniel Emmet	25	Singing	Opera Singer	Las Vegas	3	Finalist
Duo Transcend	29 & 32	Acrobatics	Trapeze Duo	Salt Lake City, Utah	2	Finalist
Flau'jae	14	Singing	Rapper	Savannah, Georgia	1	Eliminated
Front Pictures	41 & 43	Variety	Multimedia Act	Kyiv, Ukraine	2	Semi-finalist
Glennis Grace	40	Singing	Singer	Amsterdam, Netherlands	2	Finalist
Hans	19	Singing / Music	Singer & Accordionist	Adelaide, Australia	3	Eliminated
Human Fountains	24-29	Variety	Water Spitting Act	Los Angeles	1	Eliminated
Joseph O'Brien	20	Singing / Music	Singer & Pianist	Columbia, Tennessee	3	Eliminated
Junior New System	18-25	Dance	Dance Group	Manila, Philippines	1	Semi-finalist
Lord Nil	38	Danger	Escape Artist	Italy	1	Eliminated
Makayla Phillips	16	Singing	Singer	Canyon Lake, California	2	Semi-finalist
Michael Ketterer	40	Singing	Singer	Anaheim, California	3	Grand-finalist
Mochi	29	Variety	Multimedia Diabolo Juggler	Shizuoka, Japan	1	Eliminated
Noah Guthrie	24	Singing / Music	Singer & Guitarist	Greer, South Carolina	2	Semi-finalist
Quin & Misha	70 & 35	Dance	Ballroom Duo	Orlando	2	Eliminated
Rob Lake	35	Magic	Illusionist	Norman, Oklahoma	3	Eliminated
Samuel J. Comroe	30	Comedy	Comedian	Los Angeles	2	Grand-finalist
Shin Lim	26	Magic	Magician	Boston	1	Winner
The Future Kingz	7-23	Dance	Dance Group	Chicago	3	Eliminated
The PAC Dance Team	15-18	Dance	Dance Group	Sahuarita near Tucson, Arizona	1	Eliminated
The Sacred Riana	25	Magic	Illusionist	Jakarta, Indonesia	2	Eliminated
The Savitsky Cats	24 & 45	Animals	Cat Act	Ukraine	2	Eliminated
UDI	20-37	Dance	Electronic Dance Group	Tomsk, Russia	3	Eliminated
Us the Duo	27 & 28	Singing / Music	Vocal Duo	Los Angeles	3	Semi-finalist
Vicki Barbolak	60	Comedy	Comedian	Oceanside, California	1	Finalist
Voices of Hope	5-17	Singing	Choir	Orange County, California	2	Semi-finalist
We Three	21-27	Singing / Music	Band	McMinnville, Oregon	1	Semi-finalist
Yumbo Dump	31 & 34	Variety	Novelty Duo	Okayama, Japan	2	Eliminated
Zurcaroh	8-39	Acrobatics	Acrobatic Group	Götzis, Austria	3	Runner-up

- ^1 Ages denoted for a participant(s), pertain to their final performance for this season.

=== Quarter-finals summary ===
Buzzed Out | Judges' choice | Advanced to Semi-finals
Won Online Public Vote | Won Judges' Vote | Lost Judges' Vote

==== Quarter-final 1 (August 14) ====
Guest Performer, Results Show: Darci Lynne

Quarter-Finalist	Order	Buzzes and Judges' votes				Result (August 15)
Quarter-Finalist	Order	Cowell	Klum	Mel B	Mandel	Result (August 15)
Mochi	1					Eliminated (Judges' Vote Tied - Lost by Public Vote)
Human Fountains	2					Eliminated
Angel City Chorale	3					Advanced (Online Public Vote)
The PAC Dance Team	4					Eliminated
Amanda Mena	5					Advanced
Junior New System	6					Advanced (Judges' Vote Tied - Won by Public Vote)
We Three	7					Advanced
Lord Nil	8					Eliminated
Flau'jae	9					Eliminated
Shin Lim	10					Advanced
Vicki Barbolak	11					Advanced
Courtney Hadwin	12					Advanced

==== Quarter-final 2 (August 21) ====
Guest Performers, Results Show: The Illusionists, and Light Balance

Quarter-Finalist	Order	Buzzes and Judges' votes				Result (August 22)
Quarter-Finalist	Order	Cowell	Klum	Mel B	Mandel	Result (August 22)
Makayla Phillips	1					Advanced (Online Public Vote)
Da RepubliK	2					Advanced (Won Judges' Vote)
Noah Guthrie	3					Advanced
Yumbo Dump	4	^{2}		^{2}		Eliminated
Samuel J. Comroe	5					Advanced
Voices of Hope	6					Advanced
The Savitsky Cats	7					Eliminated
Glennis Grace	8					Advanced
The Sacred Riana	9					Eliminated
Quin & Misha	10					Eliminated
Front Pictures ^{3}	11					Eliminated (Lost Judges' Vote)
Duo Transcend	12					Advanced

- ^2 Cowell and Mel B both originally buzzed Yumbo Dump, but later retracted their buzzers.
- ^3 Front Pictures were later appointed as the judges' WildCard semi-finalist.

==== Quarter-final 3 (August 28) ====
Guest Performers, Results Show: Cast of Beautiful: The Carole King Musical

Quarter-Finalist	Order	Buzzes and Judges' votes				Result (August 29)
Quarter-Finalist	Order	Cowell	Klum	Mel B	Mandel	Result (August 29)
The Future Kingz	1					Eliminated (Lost Judges' Vote)
Us the Duo	2					Advanced
Daniel Emmet	3					Advanced (Online Public Vote)
Brian King Joseph	4					Advanced
Aaron Crow	5					Advanced (Won Judges' Vote)
Joseph O'Brien	6					Eliminated
Hans	7					Eliminated
UDI	8					Eliminated
Christina Wells	9					Advanced
Zurcaroh	10					Advanced
Rob Lake	11					Eliminated
Michael Ketterer	12					Advanced

=== Semi-finals summary ===
Buzzed Out | Judges' choice | Advanced to Finals
Won Online Public Vote | Won Judges' Vote | Lost Judges' Vote

==== Semi-final 1 (September 4) ====
Semi-Finalist	Order	Buzzes and Judges' votes				Result (September 5)
Semi-Finalist	Order	Cowell	Klum	Mel B	Mandel	Result (September 5)
Amanda Mena	1					Eliminated
Junior New System	2					Eliminated
Us the Duo	3					Eliminated
Voices of Hope	4					Eliminated (Judges' Vote Tied - Lost by Public Vote)
Shin Lim	5					Advanced
Makayla Phillips	6					Eliminated
Front Pictures	7					Eliminated
Duo Transcend	8					Advanced (Judges' Vote Tied - Won by Public Vote)
Samuel J. Comroe	9					Advanced (Online Public Vote)
Michael Ketterer	10					Advanced
Zurcaroh	11					Advanced

==== Semi-final 2 (September 11) ====
Guest Performers, Results Show: BTS and cast of A Magical Cirque Christmas

Semi-Finalist	Order	Buzzes and Judges' votes				Result (September 12)
Semi-Finalist	Order	Cowell	Klum	Mel B	Mandel	Result (September 12)
Christina Wells	1					Eliminated
Da RepubliK	2					Eliminated
Noah Guthrie	3					Eliminated
Daniel Emmet	4					Advanced (Won Judges' Vote)
Angel City Chorale	5					Eliminated
Aaron Crow	6					Eliminated
Vicki Barbolak	7					Advanced
We Three	8					Eliminated (Lost Judges' Vote)
Glennis Grace	9					Advanced (Online Public Vote)
Brian King Joseph	10					Advanced
Courtney Hadwin	11					Advanced

=== Finals (September 18–19) ===
Guest Performers, Finale: Kiss

Winner | Runner-up | 3rd place | Top 5

Finalist	Performed with (2nd Performance)	Result (September 19)
Brian King Joseph	Lindsey Stirling ^{4}	3rd
Courtney Hadwin	The Struts	Finalist
Daniel Emmet	Plácido Domingo	Finalist
Duo Transcend	Lindsey Stirling ^{3}	Finalist
Glennis Grace	Bebe Rexha	Finalist
Michael Ketterer	N/A	Grand-finalist
Samuel J. Comroe	N/A	Grand-finalist
Shin Lim	Matt Iseman and Akbar Gbaja-Biamila	1st
Vicki Barbolak	David Spade	Finalist
Zurcaroh	Lindsey Stirling	2nd

- ^4 Brian King Joseph & Duo Transcend conducted a joint routine for their second performance, and thus shared the same guest performer.

== Ratings ==
The following ratings are based upon those published by Nielsen Media Research after this season's broadcast:

Episode	Title	First air date	Timeslot (EDT)	Rating (18–49)	Share (18–49)	Viewers (millions)	Nightly Rank	Weekly Rank
1	Auditions Week 1	May 29, 2018	Tuesday; 8:00 p.m.	2.5	11	12.16	1	3
2	Auditions Week 2	June 5, 2018	Tuesday; 8:00 p.m.	2.2	10	11.27	1	3
3	Auditions Week 3	June 12, 2018	Tuesday; 8:00 p.m.	2.3	10	11.46	1	1
4	Auditions Week 4	June 19, 2018	Tuesday; 8:00 p.m.	2.2	10	11.86	1	1
5	Auditions Week 5	June 26, 2018	Tuesday; 8:00 p.m.	2.0	9	11.32	1	1
6	Auditions Week 6	July 10, 2018	Tuesday; 8:00 p.m.	2.1	9	11.55	1	1
7	Judge Cuts 1	July 17, 2018	Tuesday; 8:00 p.m.	2.1	9	11.33	1	1
8	Judge Cuts 2	July 24, 2018	Tuesday; 8:00 p.m.	2.0	8	11.68	1	1
9	Judge Cuts 3	July 31, 2018	Tuesday; 8:00 p.m.	2.1	9	11.83	1	1
10	Judge Cuts 4	August 7, 2018	Tuesday; 8:00 p.m.	1.9	9	11.04	1	1
11	Quarterfinals, Week 1 (Performances)	August 14, 2018	Tuesday; 8:00 p.m.	2.1	10	11.10	1	1
12	Quarterfinals, Week 1 (Results)	August 15, 2018	Wednesday; 8:00 p.m.	1.5	8	9.85	2	2
13	Quarterfinals, Week 2 (Performances)	August 21, 2018	Tuesday; 8:00 p.m.	2.1	9	11.21	1	1
14	Quarterfinals, Week 2 (Results)	August 22, 2018	Wednesday; 8:00 p.m.	1.6	8	9.69	1	2
15	Quarterfinals, Week 3 (Performances)	August 28, 2018	Tuesday; 8:00 p.m.	1.9	8	10.78	1	1
16	Quarterfinals, Week 3 (Results)	August 29, 2018	Wednesday; 8:00 p.m.	1.5	7	9.90	2	2
17	Semifinals, Week 1 (Performances)	September 4, 2018	Tuesday; 8:00 p.m.	1.8	8	10.69	1	5
18	Semifinals, Week 1 (Results)	September 5, 2018	Wednesday; 8:00 p.m.	1.5	7	9.89	2	7
19	Semifinals, Week 2 (Performances)	September 11, 2018	Tuesday; 8:00 p.m.	1.9	8	10.75	1	4
20	Semifinals, Week 2 (Results)	September 12, 2018	Wednesday; 8:00 p.m.	1.6	8	10.15	1	5
21	The Finals	September 18, 2018	Tuesday; 8:00 p.m.	2.3	10	12.99	1	2
22	Season Finale	September 19, 2018	Wednesday; 8:00 p.m.	2.1	10	12.88	1	3

Specials

Specials	Title	First air date	Timeslot (EDT)	Rating (18–49)	Share (18–49)	Viewers (millions)	Nightly Rank	Weekly Rank
S1	Best of Auditions	July 11, 2018	Wednesday; 8:00 p.m.	0.9	5	5.98	2	4
S2	Road to Lives	August 9, 2018	Thursday; 8:00 p.m.	0.7	3	3.82	2	21
