= Shin Lim =

Canadian-American magician (born 1991)

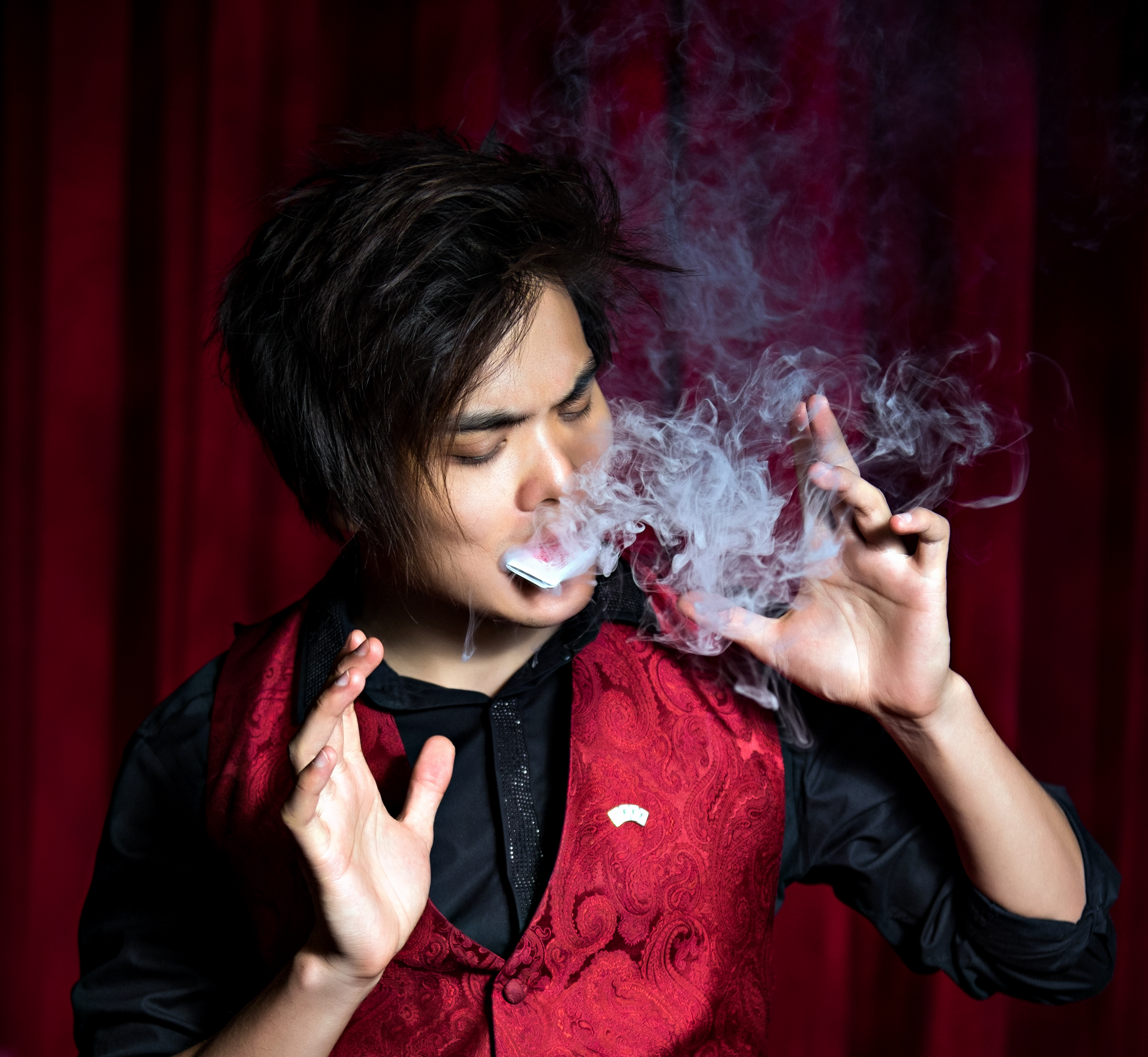
- Lim in 2016 performing his "Dream Act"
- Born: September 25, 1991 (age 34); Vancouver, British Columbia, Canada
- Occupation: Close-up magician
- Years active: 2009–present
- Known for: Penn & Teller: Fool Us; America's Got Talent season 13 winner; America's Got Talent: The Champions winner; 2015 "FISM" winner
- Spouse: Casey Thomas (m. 2019)

Liang-Shun Lim (Chinese: 林良尋; pinyin: Lín Liángxún; Wade–Giles: Lin Liang-hsün; Pe̍h-ōe-jī: Lîm Liângsîm; born September 25, 1991), known professionally as Shin Lim, is a Canadian-American magician, recognized for his use of card manipulation and sleight of hand. He is known for elaborate close-up card magic routines, during which he remains silent with the tricks set to music. He is self-taught, having learned most of his skills from watching YouTube, and has in turn shared some of his own techniques in videos on the site.

Originally educated to be a pianist, Lim took up magic as his career after being diagnosed with carpal tunnel syndrome. Lim was discovered around 2012, began to tour internationally, and subsequently won the 2015 championship of the Fédération Internationale des Sociétés Magiques in Close-up Card Magic. His appearances on Penn & Teller: Fool Us and his wins on America's Got Talent during its 13th season in 2018 and on America's Got Talent: The Champions led to even greater international fame.

== Early life ==
Lim is the second of three children of Singapore-born parents. He is of Han Chinese descent. Lim was born in Vancouver, where his father was completing postgraduate studies. Lim's family returned to Singapore when he was 2 and moved to Acton, Massachusetts, when he was 11. Lim attended the Acton-Boxborough Regional High School. As early as 9 years old, Lim showed an interest in music. His grandmother had originally given him a violin, but he became frustrated with that and smashed it after a practice session and switched over to piano. After graduating from high school, Lim attended the School of Music at Lee University in Tennessee, where he double majored in piano and telecommunications and was a member of the Choral Union ensemble.

== Career ==
=== Early years ===
Alongside music, Lim was interested in magic during his younger years. His older brother, Yi, had shown him a simple card trick, and when Lim asked him how it was done, his brother told him to look it up on YouTube. Lim delved into the videos available there and taught himself several tricks. As he started to improve his skills, he developed his own tricks, and used YouTube as a platform to show his performances and technique. Lim credited David Blaine's early television specials as part of his inspiration for magic, which moved away from large stage performances to simple but effective tricks such as card magic.

In 2011, at the age of 20, Lim was diagnosed with carpal tunnel syndrome. As the Lee School of Music required him to spend up to 20 hours a week on piano practice, he was forced to choose between his music and his magic career. He opted to stick with his passion in magic, first taking a planned year-long sabbatical from the school. Lim continued to develop tricks and produce YouTube videos of his magic, as well as developing tricks to be sold to interested fans.

During the sabbatical, he participated in the 2012 Fédération Internationale des Sociétés Magiques (International Federation of Magic Societies) World Championship, where he finished in sixth place. At this point, Lim was unsure of his career and was still considering music, but he was contacted in 2013 by an agent who had seen his performance at the World Championship, and who offered him the opportunity to tour across China. Lim agreed, and he implemented some changes to his routine as a result. In addition to extending his show to now include 20 minutes' worth of tricks, he dropped any narration from his routine, as he did not speak Chinese; this would become a defining feature of his future acts. By the end of the tour, Lim was featured as the final artist during the show. Because of this tour, he decided to drop out of the Lee School of Music to pursue magic, but with the intent to eventually return to music.

In 2015, he won the Fédération Internationale des Sociétés Magiques World Championship for Close-up Card Magic. Contrary to speculation, there was no million dollar prize, but there was potential to be seen by producers looking for talent.

=== Penn & Teller's Fool Us ===
Shortly after his World Championship win in 2015, Lim was contacted by the producers of Penn & Teller: Fool Us, a show where magicians attempt to fool hosts and magicians Penn & Teller with their tricks. They had seen his YouTube videos and offered him a spot on the show to try to fool the hosts. His routine successfully fooled the hosts. Penn Jillette described Lim's routine: "The idea of doing card tricks —which are silly at their very core — really seriously and really, really importantly is wonderful." Jillette later described Lim as part of a third wave of magicians, bridging the gap between spectacle performances such as David Copperfield and Doug Henning and the reactivity aspects of magicians like David Blaine. Lim's 2015 appearance on Fool Us, uploaded to YouTube, went viral and achieved over 50 million views, leading to his second appearance on the show in 2017 by invitation. Lim considered the 2015 Fool Us appearance as the moment that he realized his "magic's pretty special", and he decided then to stay on his career choice of magic over music. His performance in 2015 led to a number of other invitations to perform, including at the House of Magic in Macau, China, which Lim considered "the best gig in magic". His special YouTube video "Pray for Paris" performance of his "52 Shades of Red" in tribute to the victims of the November 2015 Paris attacks drew further attention to his skills.

Around March 2016, Lim injured two tendons of his left thumb while practicing a new card trick. Initially believing this would have ended his magic career, Lim received surgery to repair the tendons, and he fully recovered after intense therapy. He credited his surgeon and physical therapist for saving his career. Subsequently, on his 2017 appearance on Fool Us, he again successfully fooled Penn & Teller.

During a 2020 video chat, Lim performed a trick for them which made Penn declare, "If you were on Fool Us right now, you would have fooled us ... for the third time." He uploaded the video to YouTube, where it received over 2.3 million views (as of 2025).

=== America's Got Talent ===
Lim had been contacted by the producers of America's Got Talent after his 2015 appearance on Fool Us to see his interest in performing, but he initially turned it down as he had only one major act he could perform. By 2017 following his second appearance on Fool Us, Lim felt he was ready to appear on America's Got Talent, and was further encouraged to try out by his fiancée Casey Thomas, a dancer and assistant to another magician when he had met her. Thomas encouraged Lim and provided him with advice from her own work to improve his routines. Lim was selected for the 13th season of the show, and on September 19, 2018, he was announced as the winner. In addition to a US$1 million prize, Lim would be a headline act at the Paris Theater at Paris Las Vegas. His performances during the competition, while using variations of his tricks, included more dialogue and other aspects, for example demonstrating a bit of his pianist background for his final show. Lim said that one of the show's judges, Simon Cowell, advised him after his quarterfinal act that he needed to show more of his personality, and he needed to step back from the card table and add larger elements to his show if he wanted a chance to win. He was subsequently invited back to participate in the first season of America's Got Talent: The Champions, which started filming immediately after his 2018 13th-season win, and he edged out American ventriloquist and season 12 champion Darci Lynne.

=== Subsequent stardom ===
From his success on America's Got Talent, Lim began headlining a long–term Las Vegas residency in the Terry Fator Theatre at the Mirage Casino Hotel in October 2019. Lim also began participating on tour with The Illusionists, a theatrical magician troupe show, as well as his own United States tour in 2020. Lim made numerous guest appearances on talk shows since his wins on America's Got Talent, including The Tonight Show Starring Jimmy Fallon, The Ellen DeGeneres Show, and The Today Show. In 2020, Lim made special guest appearances on the second season of America's Got Talent: The Champions, first in a cameo as part of a magic trick performed by Britain's Got Talent contestant Marc Spelmann, aka "Magician X", and second as part of a trick by AGT semi-finalist Colin Cloud. He is currently headlining a new long-term residency at Venetian Las Vegas which- like his Mirage show- has been exceptionally well-received, winning both the 2024 and 2025 Tripadvisor Traveler's Choice Awards as well as other honors.

== Technique ==
Lim describes his approach to magic as more of an artistic show, rather than an attempt to trick people. "I'm trying to change the outlook on card magic—to make it more artistic, more visual." He has incorporated his past musical aspirations into his acts, putting nearly all his tricks to music, while staying silent during the tricks. Lim compares his act to the movie Inception, in that it is artistic, yet accessible to the masses. He also considered his magic approach similar to playing the piano, as much of his magic involves similar concepts of timing and synchronization.

Lim said that most of his tricks involve card-switching, but doing the switch either in a way that viewers cannot see where the switch occurred or in a manner that completely hides the switch. To achieve this, he records himself practicing his tricks and then plays them back in slow motion to look for any moments that give away the trick, aware that his fans on YouTube will also play back videos in slow motion to catch him. Lim also stated that he may use special decks of cards, including blank cards and decks with special finishing that make it easier for him to manipulate the cards, but does not consider these decks to be otherwise rigged.

== Personal life ==
Lim lives near Las Vegas, Nevada, and holds both Canadian and American citizenship. He became engaged to Casey Thomas whom he had met during his Macau tour in 2015, when she was performing at the theater next door to his. The two became acquainted during after-show events that brought their respective theater groups together. They married on August 19, 2019.

== Awards ==
Year	Title	Role
2010	World Teen Close-Up Magic	1st Place
2011	Adult Card Magic I.B.M.	1st Place
2011	North American Adult Card Magic (Joint S.A.M. and I.B.M.)	Champion
2012	FISM- North American Card Magic (Magic Olympics)	Finalist (In Top 6, represented North America)
2014	North American Joint S.A.M. and I.B.M.	People's Choice
2015	I.B.M North America	1st Place and People's Choice
2015	FISM	World Champion in Close-Up Card Magic
2018	Merlin Award	Best Close-Up Magician
2018	America's Got Talent	Winner
2019	America's Got Talent: The Champions	Winner

== Television ==
Year	Title	Role	Notes
2015	Penn & Teller: Fool Us	Himself	Fooler
2017	Penn & Teller: Fool Us	Himself	Fooler
2017	Die Ehrlich Brothers präsentieren: Showdown der weltbesten Magier	Himself	Winner
2018	America's Got Talent	Himself	Winner
2019	America's Got Talent: The Champions	Himself	Winner

Preceded by Darci Lynne	America's Got Talent winner Season 13 (Summer 2018)	Succeeded by Kodi Lee
