= Kevin James (magician) =

American magician

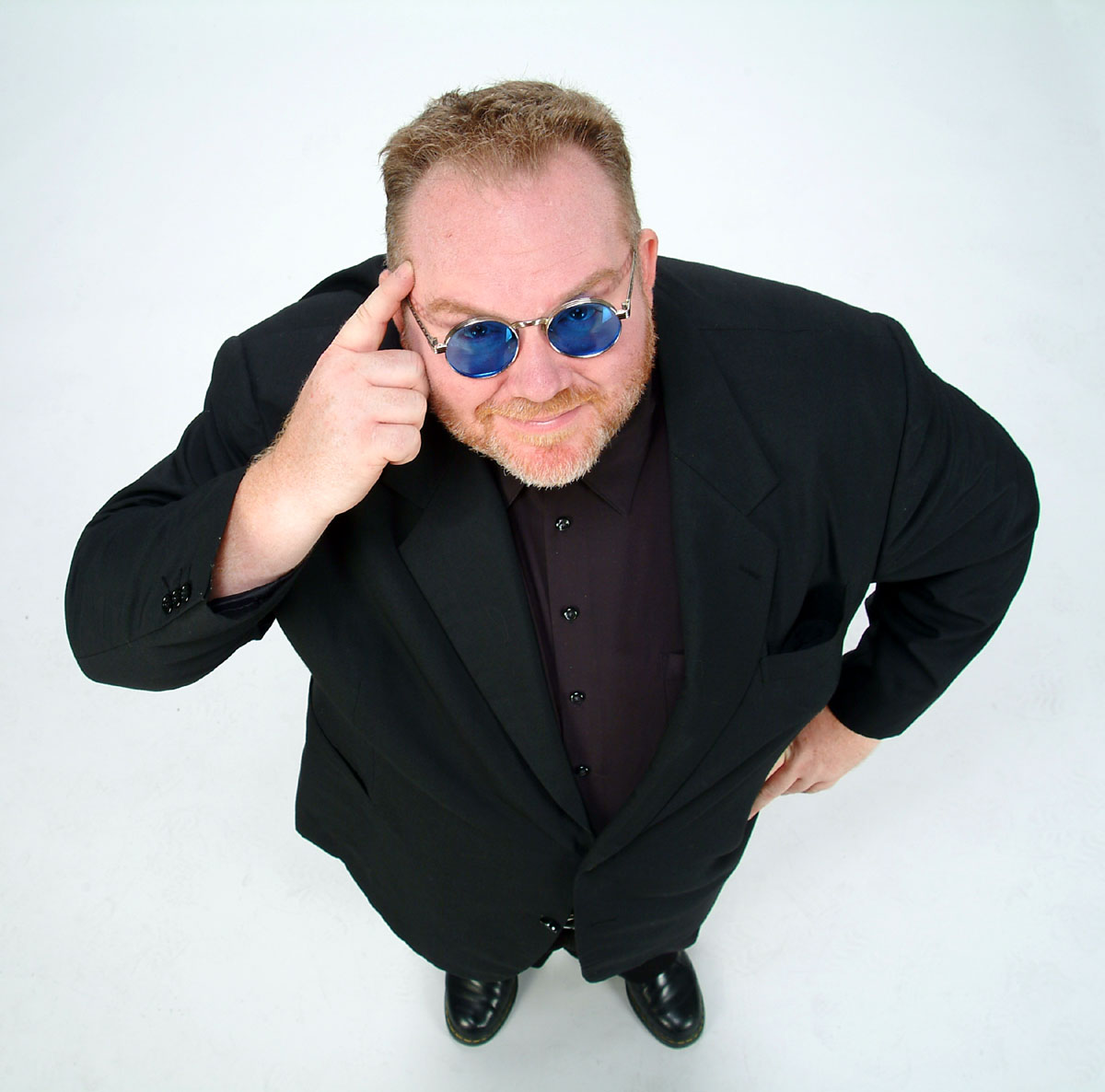
- Born: April 28, 1962 (age 63); France
- Occupation: Magician
- Website: http://www.kjmagic.com

Kevin James (born April 28, 1962) is an American magician, known for creating several unique magical effects, such as the "Floating Rose" which is performed by David Copperfield.

He had long-running performance runs at venues such as Crazy Horse (Paris) and Caesars Palace. He has won the "Parlour Magician of the Year" award from the Magic Castle and also appeared on the CBS television special, "World's Greatest Magicians at the Magic Castle". In 2007, he was a contestant on the second season of the televised competition America's Got Talent, where he proceeded as far as the semi-finals.

== Biography ==
He was born as Kevin James Lowery in France, to American parents Darrell and Mary Lou Lowery. His father was a USAF helicopter pilot stationed in Europe, though later the family relocated to the small town of Jonesville, Michigan, where James grew up.

It was in California that James joined local magician groups such as the "Long Beach Mystics" and the Magic Castle Juniors, where he was allowed to watch the professional performers. He steadily improved his technique, and in the mid-1980s won the Grand Prix award at the P.C.A.M. competition. He also created a routine which aired on Japanese and European television.

In 1991, he appeared on the French variety show Sebastien C'est Fou, which led to a job at the famed Crazy Horse in Paris, where he worked steadily for years, performing 2-3 shows per night, seven days a week. After Paris, James moved to Las Vegas, becoming a featured performer at the award-winning Splash show at the Riviera Hotel, for another multi-year run. He has opened for comedian Louie Anderson at Bally's, the Sporting Club in Monte Carlo, and headlined at the Sheraton Walkerhill in Seoul, Korea. In 2005, he was headliner and star of "The World's Greatest Magic Show" in Las Vegas.

In June 2007, James auditioned for America's Got Talent, and received unanimous approval from the judges to move on to the Las Vegas callbacks. He managed to reach the semi-finals,

== Important Shows and Venues ==
1. 2009 Command Performance at The White House in the East Room for President Obama.
2. The Crazy Horse Paris France – performed for Madonna, Prince, Jean Paul Gautier, Aerosmith
3. Caesar’s Palace – Headlined at Caesar’s Magical Empire
4. 2016 Broadway – Marriot Marquis Theatre – The Illusionists – performed for Phil Collins, Jerry Seinfeld, Woody Allen, Jules Fisher and Stephen Sondheim
5. 2017 The West End - The Shaftsbury Theatre – The Illusionists

== Awards ==
- "Parlour Magician of the Year", 2003, Magic Castle
- "Most Original", 2005, International Magicians Society
- 1988 Parlour Magician of the Year – Magic Castle
- 1995 Mandrake d'Or Award – Paris
- 2003 Stage Magician of the Year – Magic Castle
- 2004 Creative Fellowship Award – Magic Castle
- 2005 International Magician’s Society Award Most Original Illusionist
- 2008 Stage Magician of the Year – Magic Castle
- 2015 Wizard Trophy Jurmala
- 2016 Golden Magic Award – Moscow
- 2019 Mandrake d'Or Award – Paris

== Magazine Covers ==
1. Magicseen Magazine
2. Magic Magazine (Volume 14, Number 8 - April 2005)
3. Genii Magazine

== Memberships ==
- Magic Castle. Getting on this list makes you a Life Member at the Magic Castle

== TV Performances ==
1. Korean TV
2. America’s Got Talent
3. British TV
4. Brazilian TV
5. Indonesian TV
6. Best Comedy Illusionists Award
7. French TV – Le Grand Caberet du Monde
8. French TV – Les Plus Grands Magiciens du Monde - Les Mandrakes d'Or
