= Raymond Crowe =

Australian entertainer

Raymond Crowe is an Australian entertainer.

Originally from Adelaide, Crowe brands himself as "Australia's only Unusualist". His act includes mime, ventriloquism, stage magic, and shadow play using only his hands and arms.

His shadow play video using Louis Armstrong's What a Wonderful World has been performed on the David Letterman and Craig Ferguson shows, and the 2007 Royal Variety Performance in front of Queen Elizabeth. Crowe first appeared on the World's Greatest Magic in the late 1990s. He was featured as the cover story in Magic Magazine, June 2008. He has also performed at Caesars Palace. In 2013, he appeared on Australia's Got Talent where he was a finalist.
