= America's Got Talent: All-Stars =

American TV talent competition program

- Genre: Reality; Talent contest
- Showrunner: Jason Raff
- Directed by: Russell Norman
- Presented by: Terry Crews
- Judges: Howie Mandel; Heidi Klum; Simon Cowell
- Country of origin: United States
- Original language: English
- No. of seasons: 1
- No. of episodes: 9

Production
- Executive producers: Simon Cowell; Jason Raff; Sam Donnelly; Natasha Brugler
- Camera setup: Multi-camera
- Production companies: Fremantle; Syco Entertainment

Original release
- Network: NBC
- Release: January 2 – February 27, 2023

Related
- America's Got Talent; America's Got Talent: Fantasy League; America's Got Talent: The Champions; Britain's Got Talent: The Champions

America's Got Talent: All-Stars (also known as AGT: All-Stars) is an American reality television and talent competition series that premiered on NBC on January 2, 2023. The "all-stars" series is a spin-off featuring winners, finalists, fan favorites, and others from previous seasons of America's Got Talent and across the Got Talent franchise. Terry Crews hosts the series, with Simon Cowell, Heidi Klum, and Howie Mandel serving as judges. In the finale, the winner receives a cash prize of $500,000.

== Production ==
Judges and Presenter for America's Got Talent: All-Stars

Simon Cowell

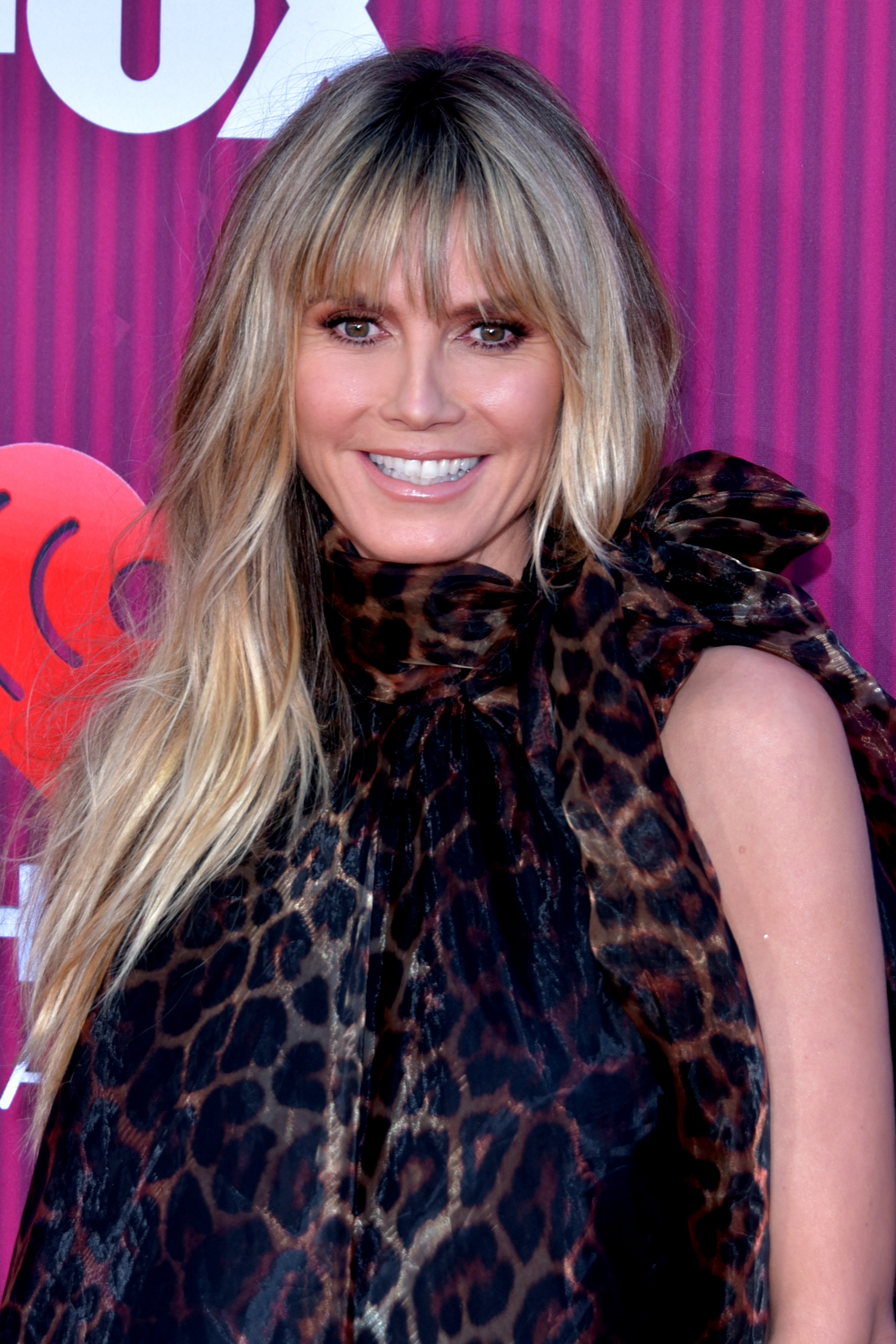
Heidi Klum

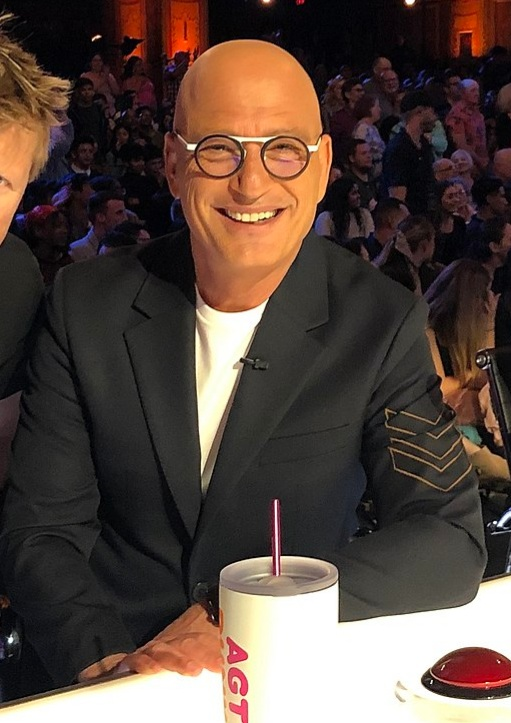
Howie Mandel

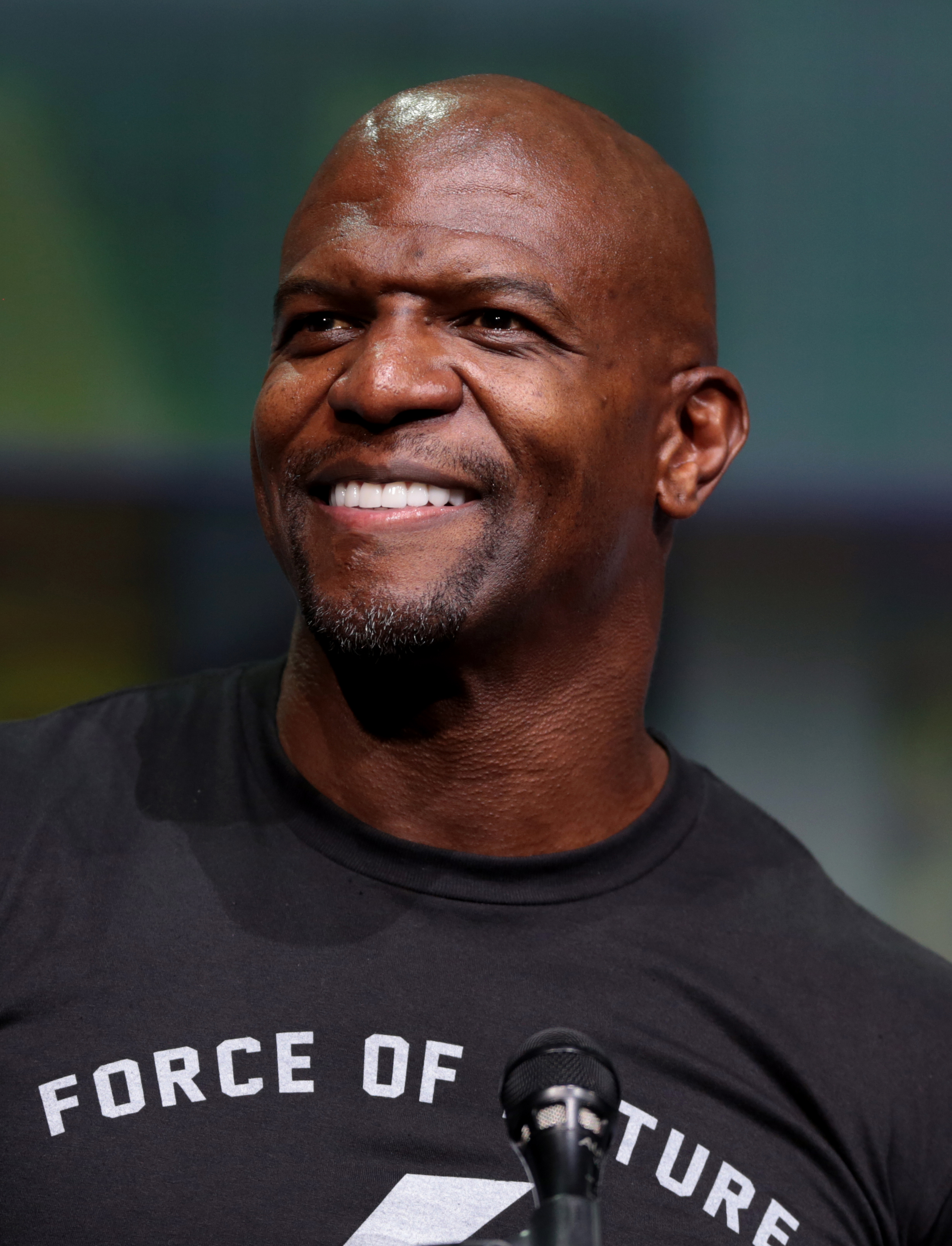
Terry Crews

On October 7, 2022, NBC announced its third spin-off of the main series. Similar to the first spin-off, America's Got Talent: The Champions, the "all-stars" format will include past winners, finalists, and fan favorites from across previous seasons of the franchise, competing for the All-Star title. The series, with judges Simon Cowell, Heidi Klum, and Howie Mandel as well as host Terry Crews, began production in October 2022, and premiered on January 2, 2023.

== Overview ==
The contest's preliminaries features 10 acts per episode. While those receiving a golden buzzer in each preliminary secure an automatic place in the grand finale, contestants compete for the remaining places. The following table lists each contestant who took part, and their history in the Got Talent franchise – per respective international version, season, and performance, in chronological order from first to more recent appearance:

Got Talent History Key	AGT — America's Got Talent	AsGT — Asia's Got Talent	AuGT — Australia's Got Talent	BGT — Britain's Got Talent	BGTC — Britain's Got Talent: The Champions	BGTTUM — Britain's Got Talent: The Ultimate Magician	BeGT — Belgium's Got Talent	BuGT — Bulgaria's Got Talent
Got Talent History Key	CGT — Canada's Got Talent	ChGT — China's Got Talent	DGT — Dominicana's Got Talent	DS — Das Supertalent	FGT — France's Got Talent	GrGT — Greece's Got Talent	IGT — India's Got Talent	IrGT — Ireland's Got Talent
Got Talent History Key	IsGT — Israel's Got Talent	ItGT — Italia's Got Talent	PGT — Pilipinas Got Talent	RT — Romania's Got Talent	SGT — Got Talent España	UGT — Ukraine's Got Talent		

Winner | Runner-up | Third place | Finalist
Eliminated | Golden Buzzer Finalist

Participant	Act	Got Talent history	Preliminary	Results
Aidan Bryant	Aerialist	AGT: S16 – Runner-up	2	Winner
Aidan McCann	Close Up Magician	IrGT: S2 – Semi-finalist ; BGT: S14 – Finalist	4	Grand-finalist
Alan Silva	Aerialist	AGT: S15 – Grand-finalist	1	Eliminated
Ana-Maria Mărgean	Ventriloquist	RT: S11 – Winner	5	Grand-finalist
Aneeshwar Kunchala	Poet	BGT: S15 – Finalist	1	Eliminated
Archie Williams	Singer	AGT: S15 – Finalist	5	Eliminated
Avery Dixon	Saxophonist	AGT: S17 – Finalist	3	Runner-up
Axel Blake	Comedian	BGT: S15 – Winner	5	Eliminated
Bello Sisters	Acrobatic Trio	AGT: S15 – Finalist	1	Finalist
Berywam	Beatboxing Group	FGT: S13 – Third Place; AGT: S14 – Quarter-finalist	1	Eliminated
Bir Khalsa	Danger Group	IGT: S2 – Third Place; AGT: S14 – Quarter-finalist; AuGT: S10 – Semi-finalist	3	Eliminated
Brandon Leake	Poet	AGT: S15 – Winner	6	Eliminated
Brett Loudermilk	Sword Swallower	AGT: S15 – Semi-finalist	6	Eliminated
Caly Bevier	Singer	AGT: S11 – Semi-finalist	1	Eliminated
Captain Ruin	Knife Thrower	AuGT: S9 – Semi-finalist	3	Eliminated
Cristina Rae	Singer	AGT: S15 – Third Place	4	Eliminated
Dance Town Family	Dance Group	AGT: S15 – Semi-finalist	3	Eliminated
Daneliya Tuleshova	Singer	AGT: S15 – Finalist	6	Eliminated
Darius Mabda	Dancer	RT: S12 – Winner	4	Eliminated
Detroit Youth Choir	Choir	AGT: S14 – Runner-up	2	Finalist
Divyansh & Manuraj	Beatboxer & Flautist	IGT: S9 – Winner	2	Eliminated
Dustin Tavella	Magician	AGT: S16 – Winner	2	Eliminated
Dustin's Dojo	Karate Trio	AGT: S9 – Participant	3	Eliminated
Emil & Dariel	Cello Duo	AGT: S9 – Finalist	4	Eliminated
Eric Chien	Magician	AsGT: S3 – Winner; AGT: S14 – Semi-finalist; ChGT: S7 – Finalist; BGTTUM: S1 – Winner	6	Eliminated
Flau'jae	Rapper	AGT: S13 – Quarter-finalist	6	Eliminated
Human Fountains	Water Spitting Group	AGT: S13 – Quarter-finalist	4	Eliminated
Jackie Fabulous	Comedian	AGT: S14 – Semi-finalist	2	Eliminated
Jamie Leahey	Ventriloquist	BGT: S15 – Runner-up	2	Eliminated
Jasper Cherry	Close Up Magician	BGT: S14 – Finalist	5	Eliminated
Jeanick Fournier	Singer	CGT: S2 – Winner	1	Eliminated
Jimmie Herrod	Singer	AGT: S16 – Finalist	1	Eliminated
Josh Blue	Comedian	AGT: S16 – Third Place	6	Eliminated
Keiichi Iwasaki	Magician	ItGT: S7 – Semi-finalist; SGT: S3 – Finalist; BuGT: S7 – Finalist; DS: S15 – Finalist; BGT: S15 – Semi-finalist	3	Eliminated
Keren Montero	Singer	DGT: S2 – Winner	3	Eliminated
Kodi Lee	Singer & Pianist	AGT: S14 – Winner	6	Finalist
Light Balance Kids^{1}	Electronic Dance Group	UGT: S9 – Participant; AGT: S14 – Finalist; DS: S15 – Finalist	1	Third place
Lioz Shem Tov	Comedy Mentalist	IsGT: S1 – Semi-finalist; AGT: S13 – Participant; AuGT: S9 – Grand-finalist; FGT: S14 – Participant; BGT: S14 – Participant	1	Eliminated
Lukas & Falco	Dog Act	DS: S7 – Winner; AGT: S14 – Semi-finalist	6	Eliminated
Malevo	Malambo Group	AGT: S11 – Semi-finalist	2	Eliminated
Mandy Harvey	Singer & Ukulelist	AGT: S12 – Grand-finalist	5	Eliminated
Mervant Vera	Magician & Rapper	AGT: S17 – Semi-finalist	5	Eliminated
Mike E. Winfield	Comedian	AGT: S17 – Finalist	3	Finalist
Mini Droids	Dance Group	BeGT S7 – Winner	4	Eliminated
Ndlovu Youth Choir	Choir	AGT: S14 – Finalist	4	Eliminated
Peter Antoniou	Magician	AGT: S16 – Semi-finalist	3	Eliminated
Peter Rosalita	Singer	AGT: S16 – Semi-finalist	5	Eliminated
Power Duo	Dance Duo	PGT: S5 – Winner; AsGT: S3 – Third Place	4	Finalist
Robert Finley	Singer	AGT: S14 – Semi-finalist	4	Eliminated
Sacred Riana	Illusionist	AsGT: S2 – Winner; AGT: S13 – Quarter-finalist; BGTC: S1 – Participant; FGT: S17 – Semi-finalist	4	Eliminated
Sara James	Singer	AGT: S17 – Finalist	2	Eliminated
Sethward	Novelty Act	AGT: S13 – Participant; AGT: S14 – Participant; AGT: S16 – Quarter-finalist; AGT: S17 – Participant	6	Eliminated
Terry Fator	Ventriloquist	AGT: S2 – Winner	1	Eliminated
Tom Ball	Singer	BGT: S15 – Third Place	5	Finalist
Tone the Chief	Rapper	AGT: S8 – Semi-finalist	2	Eliminated
Vitória Bueno	Dancer	DS: S15 – Runner-up	2	Eliminated
Viviana Rossi	Aerialist	RT: S10 – Participant; AGT: S17 – Participant	3	Eliminated
Voices of Hope Choir	Choir	AGT: S13 – Semi-finalist	6	Eliminated
World Taekwondo Demonstration Team	Martial Arts Troupe	ItGT: S11 – Finalist; AGT: S16 – Finalist; FGT: S16 – Finalist	5	Eliminated
Yumbo Dump	Novelty Act	AsGT: S2 – Semi-finalist; AGT: S13 – Quarter-finalist; FGT: S14 – Semi-finalist; DS: S13 – Finalist; IsGT: S2 – Participant; GrGT: S7 – Participant	5	Eliminated

- ^1 The act is made up of members of both Light Balance and Light Balance Kids, as some members of Light Balance Kids were unable to leave Ukraine due to the ongoing conflict. However, the act is still credited as just Light Balance Kids.

=== Preliminaries Summary ===
Golden Buzzer Advancement | Won the Superfan vote | Eliminated – 2nd in Vote
Eliminated – 3rd in Vote | Eliminated | Buzzed out

==== Preliminary 1 (January 2) ====
Participant	Order	Buzzes			Result
Participant	Order	Cowell	Klum	Mandel	Result
Bello Sisters	1				Advanced (Won Superfan Vote)
Aneeshwar Kunchala	2				Eliminated
Caly Bevier	3				Eliminated (3rd in Superfan Vote)
Lioz Shem Tov	4				Eliminated
Jeanick Fournier	5				Eliminated
Light Balance Kids	6				Advanced
Berywam	7				Eliminated
Alan Silva	8				Eliminated
Jimmie Herrod	9				Eliminated
Terry Fator	10				Eliminated (2nd in Superfan Vote)

==== Preliminary 2 (January 9) ====
Participant	Order	Buzzes			Result
Participant	Order	Cowell	Klum	Mandel	Result
Divyansh & Manuraj	1				Eliminated (2nd in Superfan Vote)
Sara James	2				Eliminated
Malevo	3				Eliminated
Tone the Chief	4				Eliminated
Dustin Tavella	5				Eliminated
Aidan Bryant	6				Advanced (Won Superfan Vote)
Jamie Leahey	7				Eliminated
Jackie Fabulous	8				Eliminated
Detroit Youth Choir	9				Advanced
Vitória Bueno	10				Eliminated (3rd in Superfan Vote)

==== Preliminary 3 (January 16) ====
Participant	Order	Buzzes			Result
Participant	Order	Cowell	Klum	Mandel	Result
Avery Dixon	1				Advanced (Won Superfan Vote)
Peter Antoniou	2				Eliminated (2nd in Superfan Vote)
Viviana Rossi	3				Eliminated
Dustin's Dojo	4				Eliminated
Mike E. Winfield	5				Advanced
Keiichi Iwasaki	6			^{2}	Eliminated
Dance Town Family	7				Eliminated
Keren Montero	8				Eliminated (3rd in Superfan Vote)
Captain Ruin	9				Eliminated
Bir Khalsa	10				Eliminated

- ^2 Iwasaki intentionally hit Mandel's buzzer as part of his act.

==== Preliminary 4 (January 23) ====
Participant	Order	Buzzes			Result
Participant	Order	Cowell	Klum	Mandel	Result
Power Duo	1				Advanced (Won Superfan Vote)
Cristina Rae	2				Eliminated
Human Fountains	3				Eliminated
Emil & Dariel	4				Eliminated
Darius Mabda	5				Eliminated (3rd in Superfan Vote)
Sacred Riana	6	^{3}			Eliminated
Aidan McCann	7				Advanced
Robert Finley	8				Eliminated
Mini Droids	9				Eliminated
Ndlovu Youth Choir	10				Eliminated (2nd in Superfan Vote)

- ^3 Simon Cowell attempted to buzz the act but the buzzer was disabled.

==== Preliminary 5 (January 30) ====
Participant	Order	Buzzes			Result
Participant	Order	Cowell	Klum	Mandel	Result
Peter Rosalita	1				Eliminated (2nd in Superfan Vote)
Axel Blake	2				Eliminated
Mandy Harvey	3				Eliminated (3rd in Superfan Vote)
Yumbo Dump	4				Eliminated
Mervant Vera	5				Eliminated
Tom Ball	6				Advanced
World Taekwondo	7				Eliminated
Jasper Cherry	8				Eliminated
Ana-Maria Mărgean	9				Advanced (Won Superfan Vote)
Archie Williams	10				Eliminated

==== Preliminary 6 (February 6) ====
Participant	Order	Buzzes			Result
Participant	Order	Cowell	Klum	Mandel	Result
Daneliya Tuleshova	1				Eliminated
Eric Chien	2				Eliminated
Voices of Hope Choir	3				Eliminated
Brandon Leake	4				Eliminated (2nd in Superfan Vote)
Lukas & Falco	5				Eliminated
Kodi Lee	6				Advanced (Won Superfan Vote)
Brett Loudermilk	7				Eliminated
Flau'jae	8				Eliminated
Josh Blue	9				Eliminated (3rd in Superfan Vote)
Sethward	10	^{4}	^{5}	^{5}	Eliminated

- ^4 Although Cowell's buzzer was pressed by Sethward during his performance, he hinted that he would have done so himself regardless of Sethward's action.
- ^5 Mandel and Klum's buzzers were pressed by Cowell in an attempt to end Sethward's performance. Their buzzers were not counted, so Sethward was allowed to finish his performance.

=== Finals (February 20) ===
Winner | Runner-up | 3rd place | Top 5

Finalist	Order	Performed with (2nd Performance)	Result (February 27)
Detroit Youth Choir	1	Weezer	Finalist
Ana-Maria Mărgean	2	Terry Fator	Grand-finalist
Power Duo	3	Lindsey Stirling	Finalist
Tom Ball	4	Voices of Hope Choir	Finalist
Aidan McCann	5	Mat Franco	Grand-finalist
Bello Sisters	6	Adam Lambert ^{6}	Finalist
Mike E. Winfield	7	N/A	Finalist
Light Balance Kids	8	N/A ^{7}	3rd
Avery Dixon	9	Babyface	2nd
Kodi Lee	10	N/A ^{7}	Finalist
Aidan Bryant	11	Adam Lambert ^{6}	1st

- ^6 Bello Sisters and Aidan Bryant conducted a joint routine for their second performance, and thus shared the same guest performer.
- ^7 Light Balance Kids and Kodi Lee conducted a joint routine for their second performance.

== Ratings ==
Viewership and ratings per episode of America's Got Talent: All-Stars
No.	Title	Air date	Rating (18–49)	Viewers (millions)	DVR (18–49)	DVR viewers (millions)	Total (18–49)	Total viewers (millions)	Ref.
1	"Auditions 1"	January 2, 2023	0.6	5.27	0.1	0.73	0.7	6.00	
2	"Auditions 2"	January 9, 2023	0.5	4.46	0.1	0.88	0.6	5.34	
3	"Auditions 3"	January 16, 2023	0.4	3.68	0.1	0.83	0.5	4.51	
4	"Auditions 4"	January 23, 2023	0.6	4.91	TBD	TBD	TBD	TBD	
5	"Auditions 5"	January 30, 2023	0.5	4.98	TBD	TBD	TBD	TBD	
6	"Auditions 6"	February 6, 2023	0.6	4.84	TBD	TBD	TBD	TBD	
7	"Finals Preview: From the Judges' Desk"	February 13, 2023	0.5	3.98	TBD	TBD	TBD	TBD	
8	"Final Performances"	February 20, 2023	0.5	5.09	TBD	TBD	TBD	TBD	
9	"Finale Results"	February 27, 2023	0.6	5.26	TBD	TBD	TBD	TBD	
