= America's Got Talent season 16 =

America's Got Talent
- Season 16
- Promotional poster for season 16, featuring (L to R) judges Mandel, Vergara, Cowell, host Crews, and judge Klum
- Showrunners: Jason Raff; Sam Donnelly
- Hosted by: Terry Crews
- Judges: Howie Mandel; Heidi Klum; Sofía Vergara; Simon Cowell
- Winner: Dustin Tavella
- Runner-up: Aidan Bryant
- Finals venue: Dolby Theatre
- No. of episodes: 21

Release
- Original network: NBC
- Original release: June 1 – September 15, 2021

Season chronology
- ← Previous; Season 15 Next → Season 17

Judges and Host for America's Got Talent Season 16

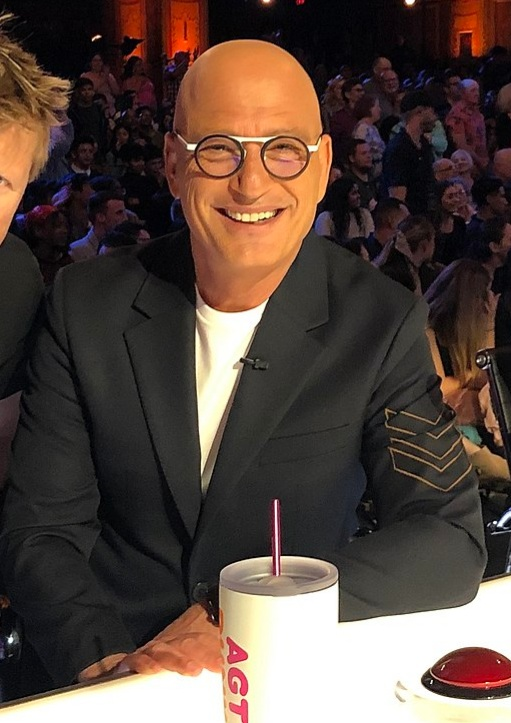
Howie Mandel

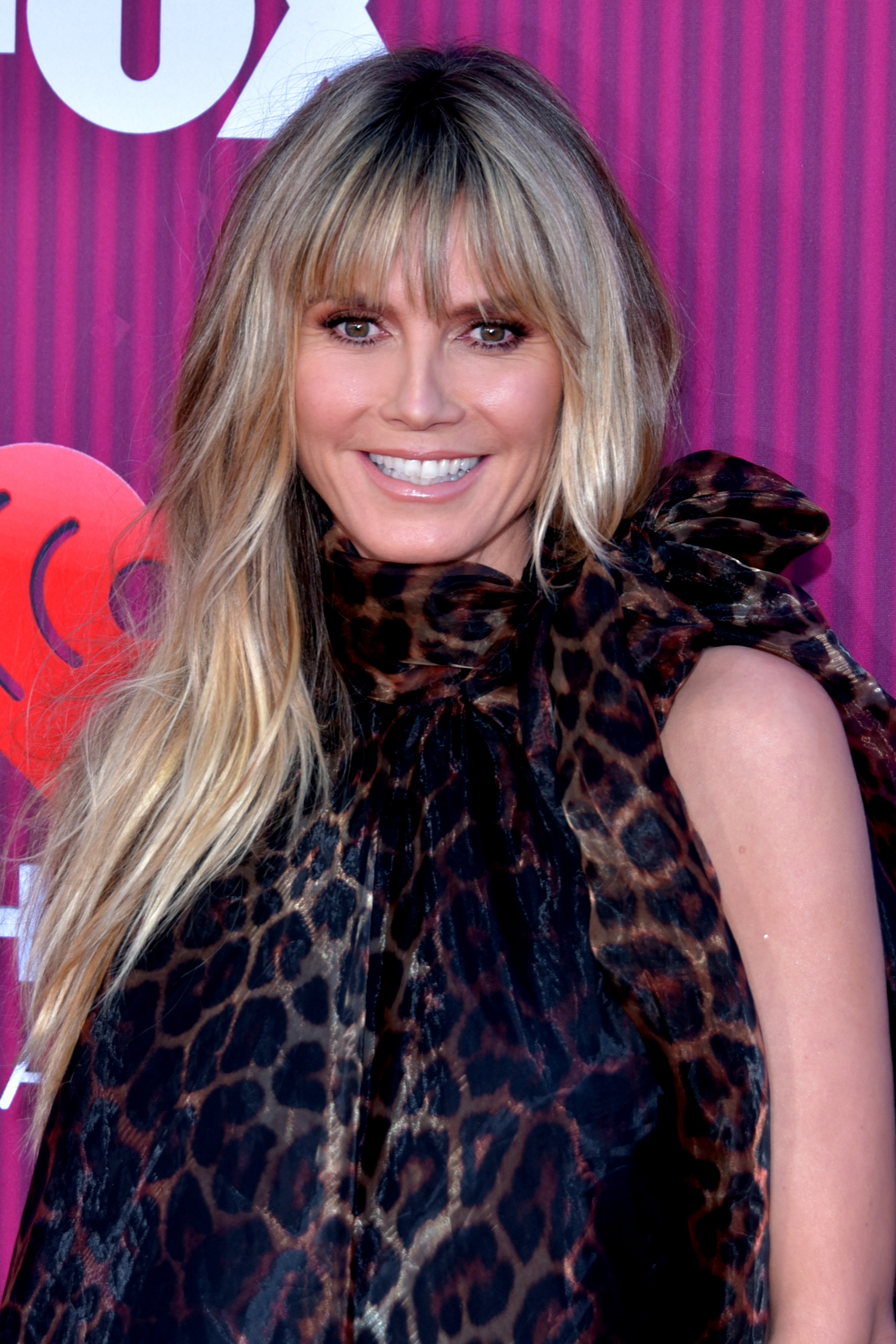
Heidi Klum

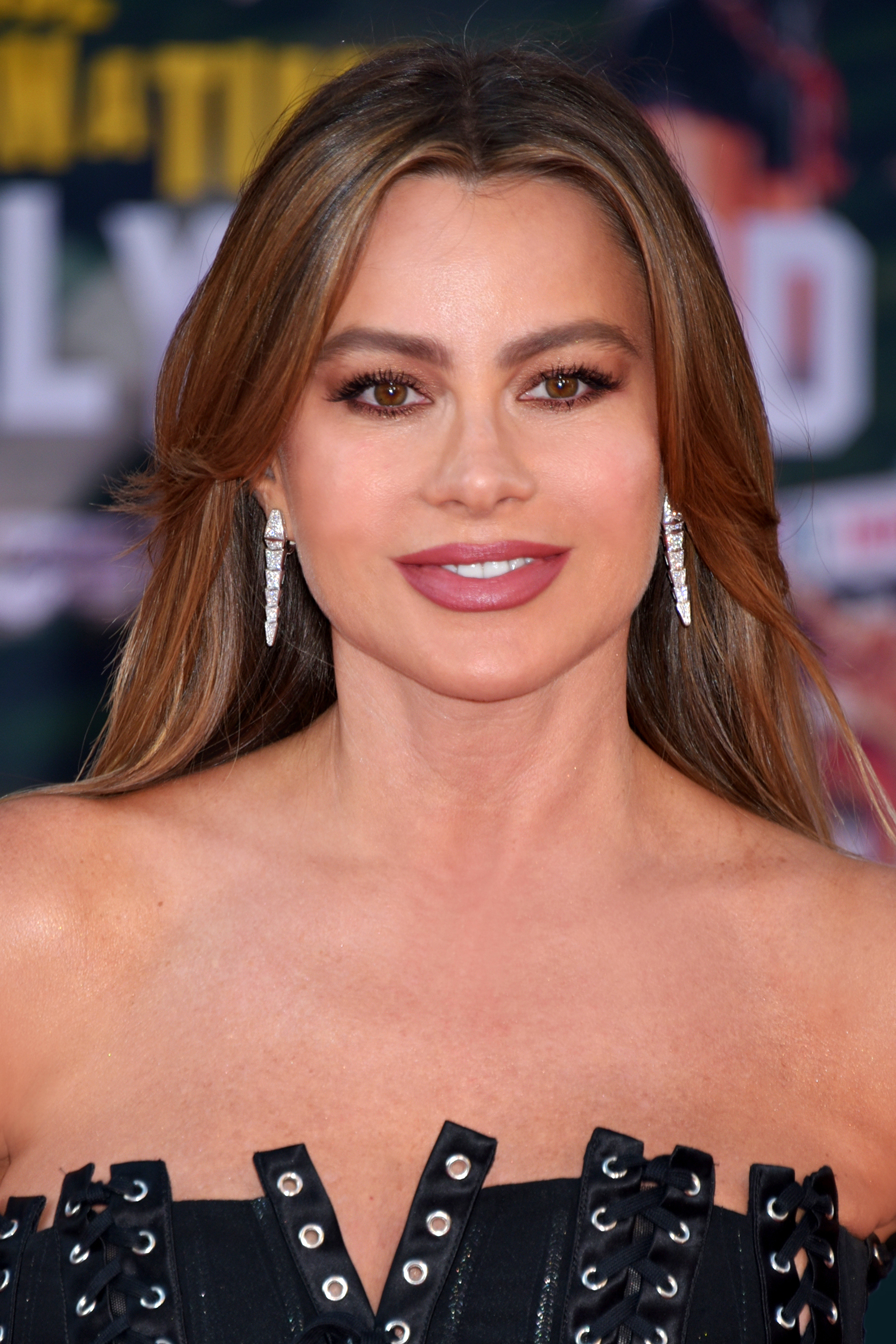
Sofía Vergara

Simon Cowell

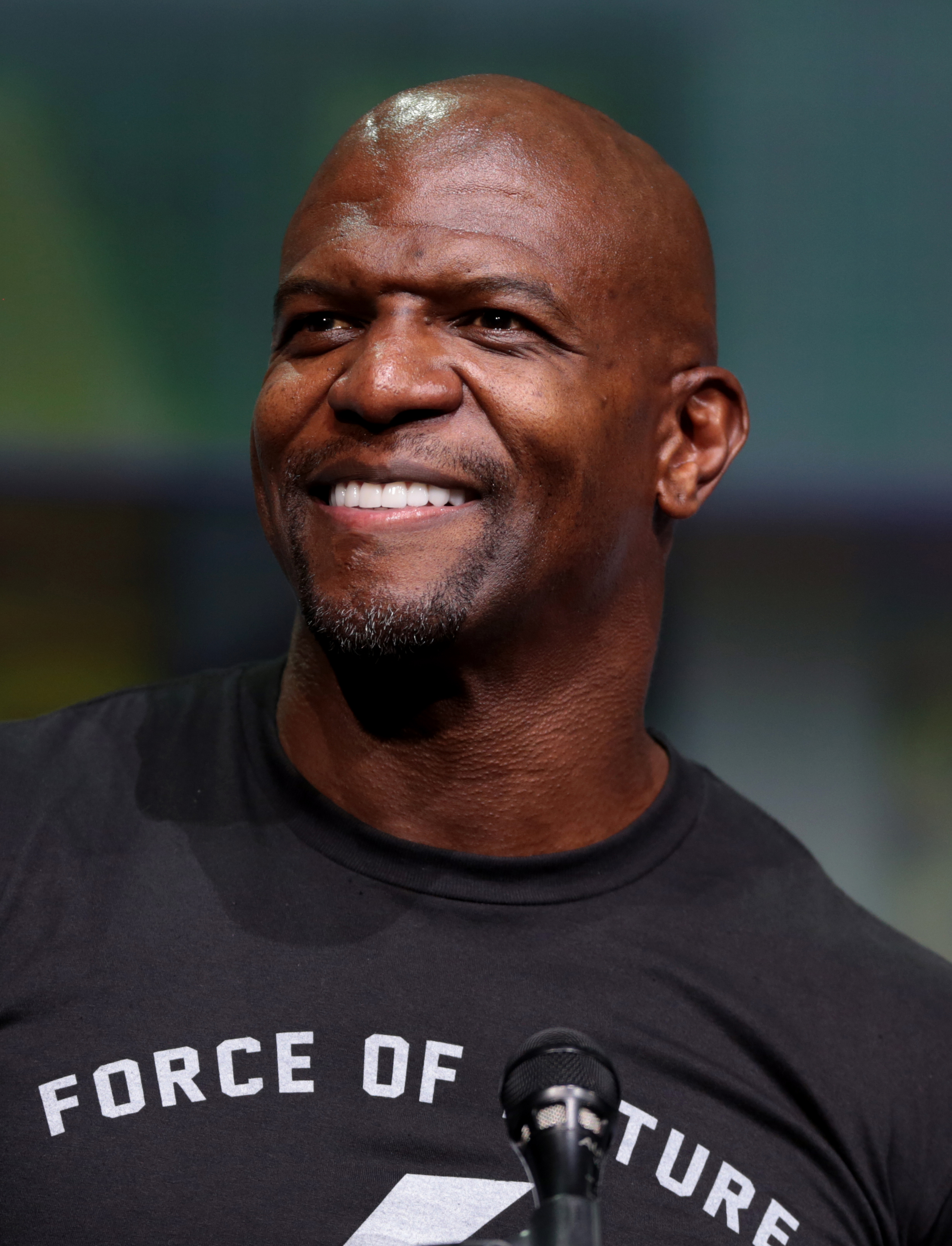
Terry Crews

The sixteenth season of the American talent show competition series America's Got Talent was broadcast on NBC from June 1 to September 15, 2021. Although production was still impacted by the COVID-19 pandemic, live audiences were involved during audition sessions and live round stages of the competition. After Simon Cowell returned to his role on the program after an accident the previous year, the Judges Cuts round was replaced by him with a new deliberation format arrangement similar to that used in Britain's Got Talent.

This season included the first group Golden Buzzer in the program's history, and the creation of a "Wildcard" special (which aired via online streaming service Peacock on August 10, 2021), following the withdrawal of a Golden Buzzer participant. The sixteenth season was won by magician Dustin Tavella, with aerialist Aidan Bryant finishing second, and stand-up comedian Josh Blue placing third. During its broadcast, the season averaged around 6.60 million viewers, excluding its online Wildcard special.

== Production ==
On February 24, 2021, the new season's line-up of judges and host was announced, revealing that Cowell would be returning, following an accident the previous year that had forced him to be absent in the fifteenth season's live episodes. Closed auditions were held across March and April, with footage taken from these undergoing final editing before the season's premiere at the beginning of June. A two-week hiatus in the broadcast schedule was also made, to avoid the NBC's live coverage of the postponed 2020 Summer Olympics between July and August.

The Judge Cuts round, which had been significantly modified in the previous season due to the disruption of production, was replaced by the deliberation format used by Britain's Got Talent. The judges conferred after the conclusion of auditions, to determine which acts would proceed to the live rounds. Some deliberations were filmed and used to fill in the remaining portions of the final audition episode for the season, as was done for the British edition of the show.

Due to COVID-19 pandemic restrictions, the auditions were conducted with smaller audiences, augmented with stock footage of audiences from previous seasons and other editing techniques. With restrictions eased in California effective June 15, the live rounds returned to their usual home of the Dolby Theatre, but with audience members required to be vaccinated for COVID-19 and wear masks.

== Season overview ==
During auditions, the judges and host agreed to grant a group Golden Buzzer for the first time in the program's history. Although this would have meant six guaranteed places in the quarter-finals, singer Nightbirde later withdrew from the competition to focus on her battle with cancer, despite receiving a Golden Buzzer. As a result of this, her place was converted into a Wildcard slot, with the process conducted via a special episode on the streaming service Peacock on the same night as the first quarter-final. The process involved five participants picked from those who were eliminated during the deliberation phase, with viewers voting via Twitter over a three-day period on which of these would be their Wildcard in the third quarter-final.

Of the participants who auditioned this season, thirty-six secured a place in the live quarterfinals, with twelve quarter-finalists in each quarterfinal episode. Among these included: Northwell Nurse Choir, quick-change artist Léa Kyle, singer Jimmie Herrod, World Taekwondo Demonstration Team and classical singer Victory Brinker, who each received a Golden Buzzer; and singer Storm Large, a Wildcard act voted for during the Peacock special. About twenty-two quarter-finalists advanced to and were split between the two semi-finals, with 10 semi-finalists securing a place in the finals. The following below lists the results of each participant's overall performance in this season:

Winner | Runner-up | Third place | Finalist | Semi-finalist | Quarter-finalist
America's Wildcard | Wildcard Semi-finalist | Golden Buzzer Audition

Participant	Age(s) ^{1}	Genre	Act	From	Quarter-Final	Result
1aChord	19-22	Singing	Vocal Trio	Greensboro, North Carolina	1	Semi-finalist
Aidan Bryant	16	Acrobatics	Aerialist	Prince George, Virginia	2	Runner-up
ANICA	51	Singing	Singer	Grand Barachois, New Brunswick	3	Eliminated
Beyond Belief Dance Company	8-12	Dance	Dance Group	Mesquite, Texas	1	Semi-finalist
Brooke Simpson	30	Singing	Singer	Los Angeles	3	Grand-finalist
ChapKidz	12-18	Dance	Dance Group	Fairfield, California	3	Semi-finalist
Dokteuk Crew	—N/a	Dance	Dance Group	Daejeon, South Korea	2	Eliminated
Dustin Tavella	35	Magic	Magician	Virginia Beach, Virginia	1	Winner
Gangstagrass	—N/a	Singing / Music	Band	New York City	1	Eliminated
Gina Brillon	41	Comedy	Comedian	New York City	1	Finalist
Jimmie Herrod	30	Singing	Singer	Portland, Oregon	1	Finalist
Johnny Showcase	—N/a	Singing	Singer	Philadelphia	2	Eliminated
Josh Blue	42	Comedy	Comedian	Denver	2	Third place
Kabir Singh	—N/a	Comedy	Comedian	Los Angeles	1	Semi-finalist
Keith Apicary	35	Dance	Dancer	Portland, Oregon	3	Eliminated
Klek Entos	—N/a	Magic	Horror Magician	France	3	Eliminated
Korean Soul	—N/a	Singing	Vocal Group	Seoul, South Korea	2	Semi-finalist
Léa Kyle	25	Magic	Quick Change Artist	Bordeaux, France	3	Grand-finalist
Madilyn Bailey	28	Singing / Music	Singer & Pianist	Los Angeles	1	Semi-finalist
Matt Johnson	—N/a	Danger	Escape Artist	Chilliwack, British Columbia	1	Eliminated
Michael Winslow	62	Comedy	Voicetramentalist	Orlando	3	Semi-finalist
Northwell Nurse Choir	—N/a	Singing	Choir	Long Island, New York	2	Finalist
Peter Antoniou	—N/a	Magic	Mentalist	Seattle	2	Semi-finalist
Peter Rosalita	10	Singing	Singer	Philippines	1	Semi-finalist
Positive Impact Movement	—N/a	Acrobatics	Acrobatic Group	Los Angeles	2	Eliminated
Rialcris	—N/a	Acrobatics	Acrobatic Trio	Ensenada, Mexico	3	Semi-finalist
Sethward	32	Comedy	Novelty Act	Los Angeles	1	Eliminated
Shuffolution	—N/a	Dance	Dance Group	Los Angeles	2	Eliminated
Storm Large	51	Singing	Singer	Southborough, Massachusetts	3	Eliminated
T.3	—N/a	Singing	Vocal Trio	New York City	2	Eliminated
The Canine Stars	—N/a	Animals	Dog Act	Fort Collins, Colorado	1	Eliminated
The Curtis Family C-Notes	—N/a	Singing / Music	Band	San Francisco	3	Eliminated
Tory Vagasy	20	Singing	Singer	Pompano Beach, Florida	2	Semi-finalist
UniCircle Flow	—N/a	Variety	Unicycle Group	Japan	3	Semi-finalist
Victory Brinker	9	Singing	Opera Singer	Latrobe, Pennsylvania	2	Finalist
World Taekwondo Demo. Team	—N/a	Acrobatics	Martial Arts Troupe	San Jose, California	3	Finalist

- ^1 Ages denoted for a participant(s), pertain to their final performance for this season.

=== Quarter-finals summary ===
Buzzed Out | Judges' choice | Advanced to Semi-finals
Won Online Public Vote | Won Judges' Vote | Lost Judges' Vote

==== Quarter-final 1 (August 10) ====
Guest Performers, Results Show: Brandon Leake & Darci Lynne

Quarter-Finalist	Order	Buzzes and Judges' votes				Result (August 11)
Quarter-Finalist	Order	Cowell	Vergara	Klum	Mandel	Result (August 11)
The Canine Stars	1					Eliminated
Peter Rosalita	2					Advanced
Beyond Belief Dance Company ^{2}	3					Eliminated (Judges' Vote Tied - Lost by Public Vote)
Madilyn Bailey	4					Advanced (Judges' Vote Tied - Won by Public Vote)
Kabir Singh	5					Advanced (Online Public Vote)
Dustin Tavella	6					Advanced
1aChord	7					Advanced
Gina Brillon	8					Advanced
Gangstagrass	9					Eliminated
Sethward	10					Eliminated
Matt Johnson	11					Eliminated
Jimmie Herrod	12					Advanced

- ^2 Beyond Belief Dance Company were later brought back as a Wildcard act for the Semi-finals.

==== Quarter-final 2 (August 17) ====
Guest Performers, Results Show: Kodi Lee, The Clairvoyants, and H.E.R.

Quarter-Finalist	Order	Buzzes and Judges' votes				Result (August 18)
Quarter-Finalist	Order	Cowell	Vergara	Klum	Mandel	Result (August 18)
T.3	1					Eliminated (Judges' Vote Tied - Lost by Public Vote)
Dokteuk Crew	2					Eliminated
Johnny Showcase	3					Eliminated
Tory Vagasy	4					Advanced (Online Public Vote)
Shuffolution	5					Eliminated
Aidan Bryant	6					Advanced
Northwell Nurse Choir	7					Advanced
Positive Impact Movement	8					Eliminated
Peter Antoniou	9					Advanced
Korean Soul	10					Advanced (Judges' Vote Tied - Won by Public Vote)
Josh Blue	11					Advanced
Victory Brinker	12					Advanced

==== Quarter-final 3 (August 24) ====
Guest Performers, Results Show: Shin Lim & Lindsey Stirling

Quarter-Finalist	Order	Buzzes and Judges' votes				Result (August 25)
Quarter-Finalist	Order	Cowell	Vergara	Klum	Mandel	Result (August 25)
UniCircle Flow	1					Advanced (Won Judges' Vote)
ANICA	2					Eliminated
Léa Kyle	3					Advanced
The Curtis Family C-Notes	4					Eliminated
Keith Apicary	5					Eliminated
Michael Winslow	6					Advanced (Online Public Vote)
Brooke Simpson	7					Advanced
Rialcris	8					Advanced
ChapKidz	9					Advanced
Storm Large	10					Eliminated (Lost Judges' Vote)
Klek Entos	11					Eliminated
World Taekwondo Demo. Team	12					Advanced

=== Semi-finals summary ===
Buzzed Out | Judges' choice | Advanced to Finals
Won Online Public Vote | Won Judges' Vote | Lost Judges' Vote

==== Semi-final 1 (August 31) ====
Guest Performers, Results Show: Ben Platt & Preacher Lawson

Semi-Finalist	Order	Buzzes and Judges' votes				Result (September 1)
Semi-Finalist	Order	Cowell	Vergara	Klum	Mandel	Result (September 1)
Peter Rosalita	1					Eliminated
Michael Winslow	2				^{3}	Eliminated (Lost Judges' Vote)
Beyond Belief Dance Company	3					Eliminated
Aidan Bryant	4					Advanced
Tory Vagasy	5					Eliminated
World Taekwondo Demo. Team	6				^{3}	Advanced (Won Judges' Vote)
Madilyn Bailey	7					Eliminated
Dustin Tavella	8					Advanced
Korean Soul	9					Eliminated
Gina Brillon	10					Advanced
Jimmie Herrod	11					Advanced (Online Public Vote)

- ^3 Due to the majority vote for World Taekwondo Demo. Team, Mandel's voting intention was not revealed.

==== Semi-final 2 (September 7) ====
Guest Performers, Results Show: Deadly Games & Duo Transcend

Semi-Finalist	Order	Buzzes and Judges' votes				Result (September 8)
Semi-Finalist	Order	Cowell	Vergara	Klum	Mandel	Result (September 8)
1aChord	1					Eliminated
UniCircle Flow	2					Eliminated (Lost Judges' Vote)
Léa Kyle	3					Advanced (Online Public Vote)
Kabir Singh	4					Eliminated
Northwell Nurse Choir	5					Advanced
Peter Antoniou	6					Eliminated
Victory Brinker	7					Advanced (Won Judges' Vote)
ChapKidz	8					Eliminated
Rialcris	9					Eliminated
Josh Blue	10					Advanced
Brooke Simpson	11					Advanced

=== Finals (September 14–15) ===
Guest Performer, Finale: Idina Menzel

Winner | Runner-up | 3rd place | Top 5

Finalist	Performed with (2nd Performance)	Result (September 15)
Aidan Bryant	Jordan Chiles and MyKayla Skinner ^{4}	2nd
Brooke Simpson	Bishop Briggs	Grand-finalist
Dustin Tavella	Mat Franco and Rico Rodriguez	1st
Gina Brillon	George Lopez	Finalist
Jimmie Herrod	Idina Menzel ^{5}	Finalist
Josh Blue	Kenichi Ebina, Piff the Magic Dragon, Preacher Lawson, Taylor Williamson, and Tom Cotter	3rd
Léa Kyle	Heidi Klum	Grand-finalist
Northwell Nurse Choir	Idina Menzel ^{5}	Finalist
Victory Brinker	Pentatonix	Finalist
World Taekwondo Demo. Team	Jordan Chiles and MyKayla Skinner ^{4}	Finalist

- ^4 Aidan Bryant and World Taekwondo Demo. Team conducted a joint routine for their second performance, and thus shared the same guest performers.
- ^5 Jimmie Herrod and Northwell Nurse Choir conducted a joint routine for their second performance, and thus shared the same guest performer.

== Ratings ==
Viewership and ratings per episode of America's Got Talent season 16
No.	Title	Air date	Timeslot (ET)	Rating (18–49)	Viewers (millions)	DVR (18–49)	DVR viewers (millions)	Total (18–49)	Total viewers (millions)	Ref.
1	"Auditions 1"	June 1, 2021	Tuesday 8:00 p.m.	1.0	7.37	0.3	1.91	1.3	9.28	
2	"Auditions 2"	June 8, 2021	Tuesday 8:00 p.m.	0.9	7.22	0.3	1.88	1.3	9.10	
3	"Auditions 3"	June 15, 2021	Tuesday 10:00 p.m.	0.6	4.21	0.4	2.65	1.0	6.85	
4	"Auditions 4"	June 22, 2021	Tuesday 8:00 p.m.	0.9	7.01	0.3	1.94	1.2	8.95	
5	"Auditions 5"	June 29, 2021	Tuesday 8:00 p.m.	1.0	7.08	0.3	1.99	1.3	9.08	
6	"Auditions 6"	July 6, 2021	Tuesday 8:00 p.m.	0.9	7.24	0.3	1.94	1.2	9.17	
7	"Auditions 7"	July 13, 2021	Tuesday 8:00 p.m.	0.9	7.10	0.3	1.90	1.2	9.00	
8	"Auditions 8"	July 20, 2021	Tuesday 8:00 p.m.	0.9	6.81	0.3	1.71	1.1	8.51	
9	"Quarterfinals 1"	August 10, 2021	Tuesday 8:00 p.m.	1.0	7.14	0.3	1.62	1.2	8.76	
10	"AGT: America's Wildcard^{6}"	August 10, 2021	Tuesday 10:58 p.m.	—N/a	—N/a	—N/a	—N/a	—N/a	—N/a	
11	"Quarterfinals Results 1"	August 11, 2021	Wednesday 8:00 p.m.	0.6	5.67	0.2	1.25	0.8	6.92	
12	"Quarterfinals 2"	August 17, 2021	Tuesday 8:00 p.m.	0.9	6.86	0.2	1.40	1.2	8.26	
13	"Quarterfinals Results 2"	August 18, 2021	Wednesday 8:00 p.m.	0.7	5.74	0.2	1.26	0.9	7.00	
14	"Quarterfinals 3"	August 24, 2021	Tuesday 8:00 p.m.	0.9	6.78	TBD	TBD	TBD	TBD	
15	"Quarterfinals Results 3"	August 25, 2021	Wednesday 8:00 p.m.	0.7	5.79	TBD	TBD	TBD	TBD	
16	"Semi-Finals 1"	August 31, 2021	Tuesday 8:00 p.m.	0.7	7.19	TBD	TBD	TBD	TBD	
17	"Semi-Finals Results 1"	September 1, 2021	Wednesday 8:00 p.m.	0.6	6.10	TBD	TBD	TBD	TBD	
18	"Semi-Finals 2"	September 7, 2021	Tuesday 8:00 p.m.	0.9	6.90	TBD	TBD	TBD	TBD	
19	"Semi-Finals Results 2"	September 8, 2021	Wednesday 8:00 p.m.	0.6	5.95	TBD	TBD	TBD	TBD	
20	"Finale"	September 14, 2021	Tuesday 8:00 p.m.	0.9	7.42	TBD	TBD	TBD	TBD	
21	"Finale Results"	September 15, 2021	Wednesday 9:00 p.m.	0.7	6.39	TBD	TBD	TBD	TBD	

- ^6 This episode was made available only online, via streaming service Peacock.
