= Victory Brinker =

American singer (born 2012)

- Born: February 4, 2012 (age 14); Latrobe, Pennsylvania, U.S.
- Origin: Pittsburgh, Pennsylvania, U.S
- Occupation: Singer
- Instrument: Vocals

Victory Brinker (born February 4, 2012) is an American singer and performer specializing in classical music and live covers of arias. She performed on season 16 of America's Got Talent.

== Biography ==
Victory was an early talker, and memorized albums and got into opera music at the age of 6. She went to church and memorized hymns.

She began singing opera for large audiences by performing at sporting events across the country after winning 12 talent shows.

She performed on NBC’s Little Big Shots at age 7. She then competed on season 16 of America's Got Talent when she was 9, and made it to the finals with the “golden buzzer”.

In 2022, she was awarded the Guinness World Record for the world's youngest opera singer based on her first professional contracts at age 7, when starring in Pittsburgh Public Theater’s Lights and Legends. She also appeared in the Tamron Hall show. Later that year around Christmas, she performed all over New York City, and with the Latshaw Pops Orchestra at The Palace Theatre in Greensburg, Pennsylvania. In November 2021 she released a Christmas EP titled The Wonder of Christmas.

== Discography ==
- The Wonder of Christmas (2021, EP)

== Filmography ==
Year	Title	Role	Notes
2021	America's Got Talent	Herself	Season 16 contestant
2024	The Tiny Chef Show	Herself	Episode: "Opera Cake"
