= Dustin Tavella =

American magician and singer (born 1986)

- Born: April 11, 1986 (age 40); Pottstown, Pennsylvania, United States
- Occupations: Magician, singer, musician
- Years active: 2010–present
- Known for: America's Got Talent season 16 winner
- Spouse: Kari Gibson (m. 2018)
- Website: www.dustintavella.com

Dustin Tavella (born April 11, 1986) is an American magician and singer. He is best known for being the season 16 winner of the NBC show America's Got Talent as a magician.

Since 2010, Tavella has released numerous singles, and an EP in 2014.

== Early life and education ==
Tavella was born in Pottstown, Pennsylvania, and graduated from Pottsgrove High School. As a child, he went to magic shows in Atlantic City with his grandparents, who were into gambling.

Prior to starting his music career, Tavella worked for a humanitarian organization (Compassion International), aiding the homeless and mentoring in youth programs.

== Music and magic careers ==
Upon realizing the positive impact music had on people, Tavella made a shift to an entertainment career. In 2010, after writing and recording R&B-style pop songs, he began posting them on YouTube as dUSTIN tAVELLA. Since 2011, Tavella has produced multiple singles and an EP, via his independent record label Film and Music (FAM).

In early 2012, Tavella gained some national exposure when he appeared on CMT's reality television show, Sweet Home Alabama. Mixing a bit of country (with his guitar) into his predominantly urban style, he released a few singles related to the show.

In 2013, Tavella released the single "Everybody Knows (Douchebag)", which went viral. Pop singer Selena Gomez choreographed a dance video to the song, as a "dismissal" to ex-boyfriend Justin Bieber. Later that year, Gomez made a cameo appearance in Tavella's official video for the song, featuring Danny Trejo and Francia Raisa. A five-song EP, called Phases 1 3, arrived in July 2014.

=== America's Got Talent ===
In 2018, Tavella began performing magic professionally. In 2021, he auditioned for the sixteenth season of America's Got Talent. He made it to the finals, performed with season 9 winner, Mat Franco, and Rico Rodriguez, and consequently won on September 15, 2021. Beating out nine finalists for the million dollar grand prize, Tavella is the third magician to win the show, after Franco and Shin Lim.

In 2022, Tavella began headlining America's Got Talent Live, at the Luxor Las Vegas on the Strip. His own magic show, Here Comes Trouble, incorporates his musical talent.

In August 2022, Tavella performed during the first live season 17 Qualifier Results Show, alongside judge Sofía Vergara, and was assisted by Vergara's Modern Family costar Sarah Hyland.

In January 2023, Tavella competed on America's Got Talent: All-Stars, but was eliminated in the first round.

== Personal life ==
Tavella lives in Branson, Missouri, moving there from Las Vegas, after moving from Virginia Beach, Virginia. He married Kari Gibson in 2018. They adopted two sons, Xander and Sylas, both of whom he centered acts around.

He currently performs his show "Now I See" at the Reza Live Theatre.

A devout Christian, Tavella and his wife have been active with pregnancy crisis and homeless ministries.

== See also ==
- America's Got Talent (season 16)
- List of magicians

| Preceded by Brandon Leake | America's Got Talent winner Season 16 (Summer 2021) | Succeeded by Mayyas |
