= Titan the Robot =

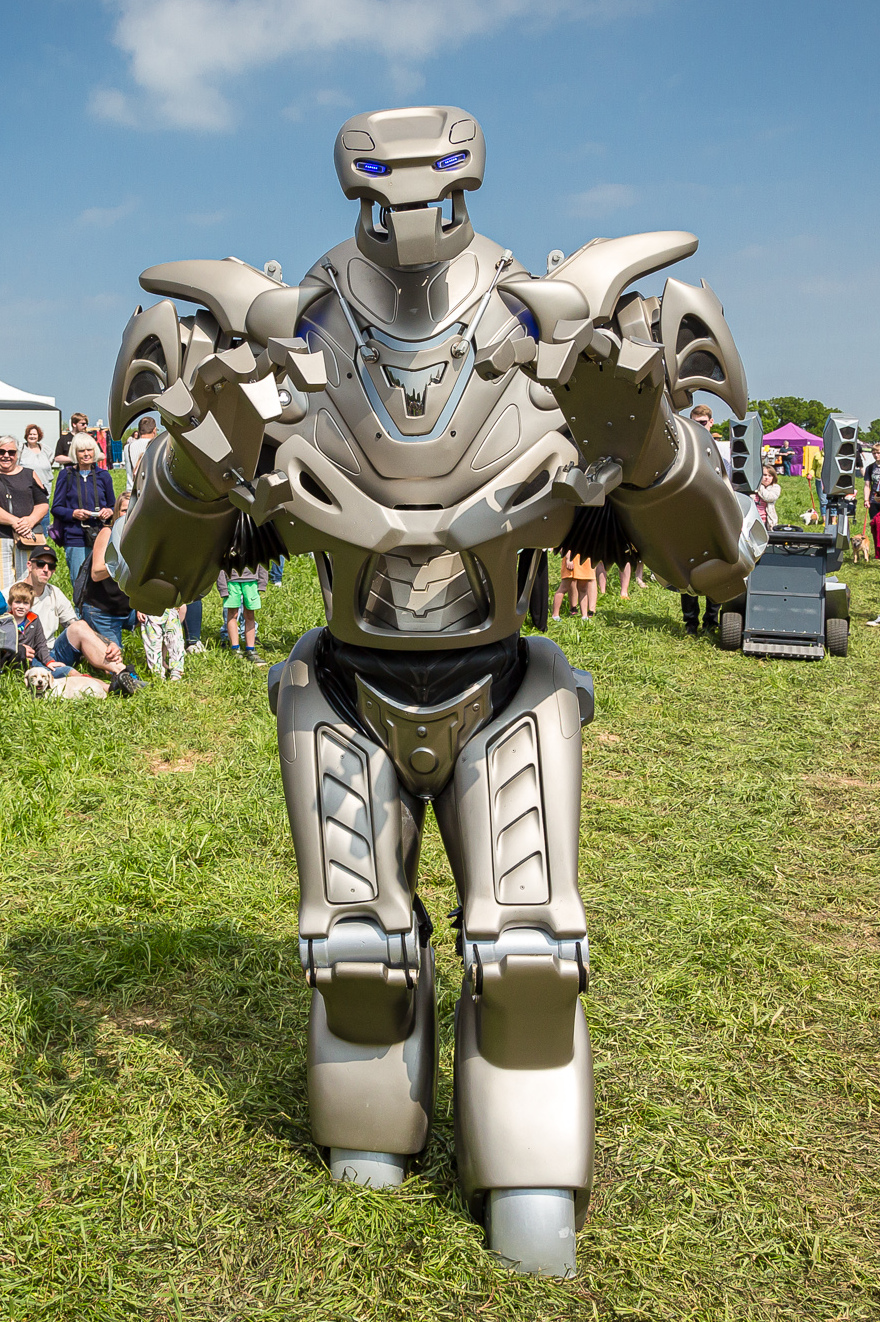
- Titan at the Dorset Country Spring Show in 2025
- First appearance: Glastonbury Festival (2004)
- Created by: Nik Fielding

In-universe information
- Type: Character
- Manufacturer: Cyberstein
- Height: 8 feet (2.4 m)
- Weight: 60 kilograms (9.4 st)
- Website: cyberstein.com

Titan the Robot (often referred to as Titan) is a robotic entertainment show developed by the British company Cyberstein Robotics Ltd. It is approximately 8 feet tall and weighs 60 kg (9.4 st) which increases to 350 kg (55 st) including the cart it rides on and onboard equipment. It is enhanced by various actuators and electronic devices, resembling a humanoid robot, that is worn by an actor who moves the appendages of the costume and controls electronic functions like sound effects from the inside of the costume.

The robot was designed by Nik Fielding, who runs Cyberstein from Newquay, Cornwall, England. Titan has performed at a variety of public and private events, such as the Commonwealth Games, Bar Mitzvahs UK shopping centres, television fundraisers and live concerts. Entered the Chinese market in 2018 and operated by Tuxuan Robotics.

== Filmography ==
Television
Year	Title	Role	Notes
2010	ECHO Awards	Performer	Two versions of Titan performed with the international pop star, Rihanna.
2010	Nickelodeon Kids' Choice Awards	Performer	Titan performed on stage again with Rihanna.
2010	Big Brother UK	Performer	Titan appeared on the 11th series of Big Brother in the UK as part of the 'Man v Machine' task.
2010	Daybreak	Performer	Titan appeared on Daybreak's "Cool before School" feature.
2013	Germany's Next Topmodel	Performer	Titan appeared on German television (Pro7) for the eighth cycle of Germany's Next Topmodel.
2020	Ant And Dec Saturday Night Takeaway	Performer	
2022	Britain's Got Talent	Performer	Titan appeared as the first audition in the first episode of the programme's 15th series. Titan also appeared in the 4th semi-final of that series.
2024	8 Out of 10 Cats Does Countdown	Performer	In series 25, episode 3, Titan featured in a sketch alongside Jimmy Carr and Rachel Riley.
