= Archie Williams (singer) =

American singer (born 1963)

- Born: March 23, 1961 (age 65); Baton Rouge, Louisiana, U.S.
- Known for: Performing on AGT Season 15 after released from prison
- Height: 5 ft 4 in (163 cm)
- Criminal charges: Wrongfully sentenced to 37 years of prison for aggravated rape, battery, and attempted murder
- Relatives: Sheila Varner, Charlotte Alexander (Sisters)

Archie Charles Williams (born March 23, 1961) is an American singer who appeared on season 15 of America's Got Talent. He was wrongfully incarcerated for 37 years in prison and released on March 21, 2019.

== Early life ==
Williams was born in Baton Rouge, Louisiana.

== Wrongful incarceration ==
On April 21, 1983, he was convicted in a case of rape and attempted murder four months earlier. Williams was 22 at the time and sentenced to life in prison without the possibility of parole in the Louisiana State Penitentiary at Angola. The Innocence Project fought for him for decades to get access to evidence that could prove that he was innocent. On March 21, 2019, after a judge ordered a review of the fingerprints found at the scene, Williams was found to be innocent and was released from prison.

== America's Got Talent ==
Williams sang "Don't Let the Sun Go Down on Me" by Elton John for his first performance on America's Got Talent on May 26, 2020. All four judges voted for him to move to the next level and he received a standing ovation from the audience and the judges. John said that he was "moved to tears" by the performance. As a result of Williams' story, Simon Cowell became an ambassador for The Innocence Project. Williams sang "Flying Without Wings" by Westlife during the semi-finals. He moved ahead to the finals with four other acts. Archie finished as a Bottom 5 finalist of the top 10. Archie Williams came back to compete in America's Got Talent: All-Stars singing "Ain't No Sunshine" by Bill Withers, but failed to secure a spot in the finale.

== See also ==
- Innocence Project
