= Léa Kyle =

French magician

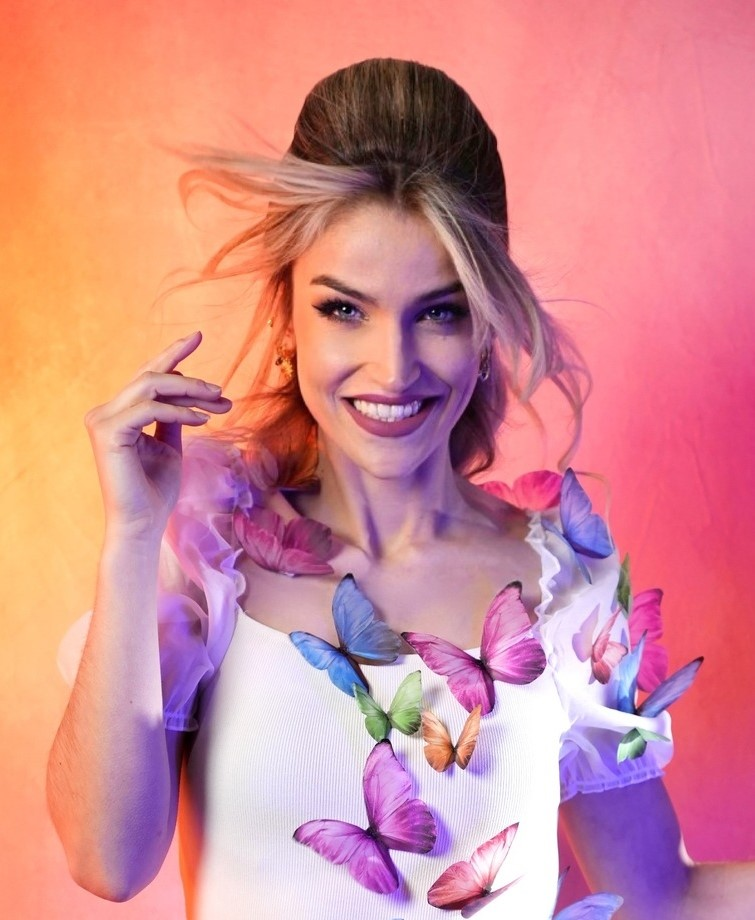
- Born: October 23, 1995 (age 30); Bordeaux, France
- Occupation: Quick-change magician
- Years active: Since 2018
- Known for: America's Got Talent; Penn & Teller: Fool Us
- Website: en.leakyle.com

Léa Kyle (born 1995) is a French magician who performs quick-change magic. She is known for receiving a Golden Buzzer for her quick-change performance, during her audition on America's Got Talent. She also appeared during the series 15 of France's Got Talent, and the seventh season of Penn & Teller: Fool Us.

== Early life and career ==
Léa Kyle was born in October 23, 1995 (age 30) in Bordeaux, France. Her love of magic began as a teenager. She also enjoys sewing, having taken part in a year-long haute couture course, and makes her own costumes.

Previously a beautician, Kyle entered her first magic contest at the Villebarou International Festival in 2018, and came out on top. A year later, she was chosen to perform in the French Magic Championships, and won the title.

Kyle appeared on France's Got Talent during its 15th series, and she successfully fooled Penn & Teller during the seventh season of Penn & Teller: Fool Us.

Kyle received a Golden Buzzer from Heidi Klum for her quick-change performance, during the season 16 auditions of America's Got Talent. A wardrobe malfunction stalled her semifinal act. She finished in fifth place during the finals.

In 2021, Kyle appeared on the Italian Saturday night show, Tú sí que vales. In March 2022, she performed on The Ellen DeGeneres Show.

== Personal life ==
Kyle was introduced to magic by her boyfriend Florian Sainvet, another magician who performed on America's Got Talent, France's Got Talent, Spain's Got Talent, and Penn & Teller: Fool Us.

On 23 May 2022, Kyle and her boyfriend were in a car accident during an Uber ride in Las Vegas. Kyle sustained three fractured ribs and a crushed lung, while Sainvet had minor injuries, including burns from his seat belt.
