= Axel Blake =

English comedian (born 1988)

- Born: 2 June 1988 (age 36); London, England
- Occupations: Stand-up comedian; presenter
- Website: www.axelblake.com

Axel Blake (born 2 June 1988) is an English comedian who won the 2022 series of Britain's Got Talent.

== Biography ==
Prior to his big breakthrough on Britain's Got Talent, Blake worked as a property maintenance manager and part-time comedian, performing stand-up gigs at comedy clubs and uploading sketches to social media as well as doing some presenting for SB.TV and UNILAD. He also appeared in the film Loves Spell and his self-funded 2018 show, I'm Not Gonna Lie, which was filmed at the Indigo at The O2 Arena, was picked up for broadcast by Amazon Prime in 2020.

Blake was Simon Cowell's Golden Buzzer act in the auditions for series 15 of BGT which aired on ITV1 from 16 April 2022 to 5 June 2022. He won the final ahead of ventriloquist Jamie Leahey and singer Tom Ball, taking home £250,000 in prize money and a spot at the 2022 Royal Variety Performance. Figures released by ITV showed Blake received almost a fifth of the public votes cast during the 11-act final at 19.7% while Leahey got 14.7% and Ball tallied 14.2%.

Since his victory, Blake has been on numerous television shows including CBBC's Saturday Mash Up, the RuPaul hosted Celebrity Lingo and hip-hop based comedy panel gameshow Don't Hate The Playaz. In January 2023, he competed on America's Got Talent: All Stars. Blake also returned to Britain's Got Talent in June 2023 for a guest appearance during the semi-finals.

== Filmography ==
=== As actor ===
Year	Title	Role	Notes
2015	Handle With Care	Comedian	Short film
2015	Pranksterz		TV movie
2020	Loves Spell	Cruz	

=== As himself ===
Year	Title	Role	Notes
2020	Axel Blake - I'm Not Gonna Lie		TV special
2022	Britain's Got Talent	Contestant	3 episodes
2022	The British Soap Awards	Presenter	
2022	Saturday Mash-Up		1 episode
2022	Celebrity Lingo	Guest	1 episode
2022	Don't Hate the Playaz	Special guest	1 episode
2022	The Royal Variety Performance		
2023	America's Got Talent: All-Stars	Contestant	1 episode
2023	Jeremy Vine	Comedian	1 episode
2023	Tonight With Target	Guest	1 episode
2023	Celebrity Eggheads	Contestant	1 episode
2023	Britain's Got Talent	Special guest	1 episode
2023	The Stand Up Sketch Show		3 episodes
2023	Sorry I Didn't Know	Panelist	1 episode
2024	Air Fryers - Which is the Right One for You?		TV special
2024	Richard Osman's House of Games	Contestant	5 episodes

Preceded by Jon Courtenay	Winner of Britain's Got Talent; 2022	Succeeded by Viggo Venn
