= Tom Ball (singer) =

British singer (born 1998)

- Born: 1 May 1998 (age 28); Brighton, East Sussex, England
- Occupation: Singer / teacher
- Years active: 2022–present
- Spouse: Hannah Burtenshaw (m. 2022)
- Website: officialtomball.com

Tom Ball (born 1 May 1998) is an English singer who rose to fame after competing in the 2022 series of Britain's Got Talent and America's Got Talent: All Stars.

== Early life ==
Ball worked as a secondary school teacher in Purley, London Borough of Croydon, whilst living in Burgess Hill, West Sussex.

== Career ==
=== Got Talent shows ===
On 17 April 2022, Ball auditioned for the 2022 series of Britain's Got Talent in front of judges Simon Cowell, Amanda Holden, David Walliams and Alesha Dixon. His rendition of Sam Smith's song "Writing's on the Wall" received a standing ovation from the crowd and the judges. In the third semi-final on 1 June 2022, he sang Conchita Wurst's "Rise Like a Phoenix". He progressed to the final on 6 June, where he sang Tom Jones's version of "I (Who Have Nothing)" and finished in third place. Figures released by ITV showed Ball received 14.2% of the public votes cast during the 11-act final behind winner, comedian Axel Blake, with 19.7% and runner-up, ventriloquist Jamie Leahey, who tallied 14.7%.

He then competed in the newly premiered America's Got Talent: All Stars. On the episode aired on 30 January 2023, he auditioned with Simon & Garfunkel's "The Sound of Silence." His performance won a Group Golden Buzzer from Cowell, fellow judges Howie Mandel and Heidi Klum, and show host Terry Crews, which secured his place in the final. On 20 February, his rendition of Radiohead's "Creep" won standing ovation from the audience. On the finale aired on 27 February he performed Queen's "Who Wants to Live Forever" accompanied by the Voices of Hope Children's Choir. However, he failed to become the final five and was eliminated.

In April 2023, he appeared on Got Talent España: All-Stars. In 2023, he was also revealed as the voice of Noodle the Cat on the 2023 series of Britain's Got Talent.

=== Debut ===
In June 2023, Ball was signed by independent label Westway Music, with his debut album Curtain Call announced to be released in March 2024.

== Personal life ==
Ball met Hannah Burtenshaw, a paediatric nurse, through online dating in 2017. They got engaged in December 2019 and married in October 2022. Tom and Hannah announced their daughter was born at exactly 00:00 on 15 January 2025.
