= Mike E. Winfield =

American comedian (born 1988)

- Born: February 23, 1988 (age 38); Baltimore, Maryland, U.S.
- Education: California State University (Sacramento)
- Occupations: Comedian; Writer; Actor
- Years active: 2008–present
- Spouse: Kisha Winfield (m. 2002)
- Children: 2 (one son and one step-son)
- Website: mikewinfield.com

Mike E. Winfield (born February 23, 1988) is an American stand-up comedian, actor and writer. He is best known for appearing on season 17 of America's Got Talent, in which he placed 6th and for receiving a golden buzzer on America's Got Talent: All-Stars.

He has also appeared in various films and TV shows, notably as a recurring character on The Office. Additionally in 2018, he won a Daytime Emmy Award for his guest performance in Conversations in L.A.

Winfield produced one comedy special, Mike E. Winfield: StepMan, that released on Amazon Prime Video in 2019.

== Early life ==
Mike E. Winfield was born on February 23, 1988, in Baltimore, Maryland. He has one younger brother.

== Career ==
=== 2008-2021: Stand-up and acting ===
After graduating high school Winfield moved to Sacramento, California to live with his dad. While there, he enrolled in the city’s California State University (which he later graduated from) and began pursuing a career as a stand-up comedian.

Early in his career he also pursued acting, landing his first role as a recurring character on the TV show The Office. He also appeared in a number of other TV shows and films, including Gary Busey: Pet Judge and Conversations in L.A. In 2018 for his role in Conversations in L.A. he won a Daytime Emmy award for Outstanding Guest Performer in a Digital Daytime Drama Series.

His first comedy special Mike E. Winfield: StepMan was released on Amazon Prime Video in 2019.

Winfield later moved to Los Angeles. In 2019 he was splitting his time between there and New York City.

=== 2022-2023: America's Got Talent ===
In 2022 he appeared on the 17th season of America's Got Talent, placing 6th. A year later he appeared on America's Got Talent: All-Stars, where he received a Golden Buzzer from judge Simon Cowell.

=== 2024-Present: Career expansion Stand-up shows ===
Since appearing on America's Got Talent, Winfield has stopped acting and now performs stand-up at shows across the country that he headlines.

== Personal life ==
Winfield is married to Kisha Winfield. He and Kisha have one son. Winfield is also the stepfather of Kisha's other son, who he often refers to as "step-man" in many of his stand-up routines.

== Filmography ==
=== Film ===
Year	Title	Role	Notes	Ref.
2018	Pimp	Science		
2019	Satanic Panic	Karim		
2020	Ballbuster	Mike		
2021	Fear Street Part Three: 1666	Martin B. Franklin		

=== Television ===
Year	Title	Role	Notes	Ref.
2008	The Bobby Lee Project	Devon	TV Movie	
2011	The Office	New Warehouse Guy	2 episodes	
2012	Funny as Hell	Himself	1 episode	
2013	Watching the Wilsons	Aaron	TV Movie	
2016	A Bronx Life	Terrell	TV Movie	
2017	Greatest Ever	Comedian	2 episodes	
2018	Conversations in L.A.	Jeremy	1 episode	
2019	Mike E. Winfield: Stepman	Himself	TV Special	
2020	Gary Busey: Pet Judge	Bailiff		
2021	Top Secret Videos	Don		
2021	Friendz	Nick	TV Movie	
2022	America's Got Talent	Himself	Season 17	
2023	America's Got Talent: All-Stars	Himself		
2025	Comics Unleashed	Himself	1 episode	
2026	Growing Up Movies	Lequan Booker	TV Movie	

== Comedy specials ==
Year	Title	Notes	Location	Ref.
2017	Brad Paisley's Comedy Rodeo	Netflix special	Nashville, Tennessee	
2019	Mike E. Winfield: StepMan	Amazon Prime Video special	Los Angeles, California	

== Awards and nominations ==
Year	Association	Category	Project	Result	Ref.
2021	Daytime Emmy Award	Outstanding Guest Performer in a Digital Daytime Drama Series	Conversations in L.A.	Nominated	
