= Britain's Got Talent series 15 =

British talent competition series

Britain's Got Talent
- Series 15
- Presented by: Ant & Dec
- Judges: David Walliams; Alesha Dixon; Amanda Holden; Simon Cowell
- Winner: Axel Blake
- Runner-up: Jamie Leahey

Release
- Original network: ITV
- Original release: 16 April – 5 June 2022

Series chronology
- ← Previous; Series 14 Next → Series 16

The fifteenth series of British talent competition programme Britain's Got Talent was broadcast on ITV, from 16 April 2022 to 5 June 2022. Filming of the series was originally planned for 2021, but with the COVID-19 pandemic in the United Kingdom having led to strict government restrictions on television production, many of the production team, including Simon Cowell, felt it would be wiser to postpone filming until conditions improved. Filming eventually began in January 2022, with Cowell making his return as a judge for the programme following his accident during the previous series.

The fifteenth series was won by stand-up comedian Axel Blake, with ventriloquist Jamie Leahey finishing in second place, and singer Tom Ball placing third. During its broadcast, the series averaged around 6.38 million viewers.

Judges and Presenter(s) for Britain's Got Talent Series 15

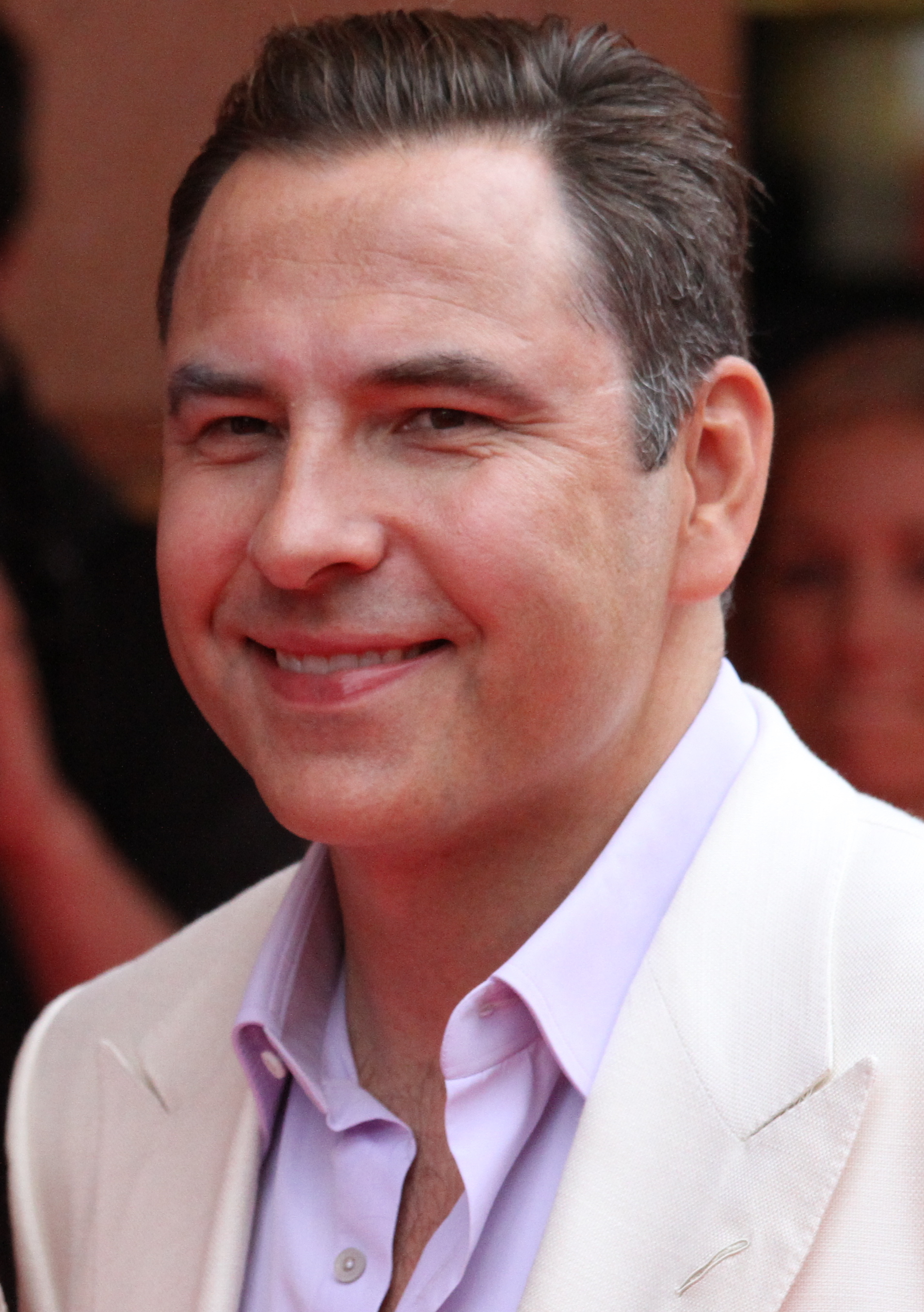
David Walliams

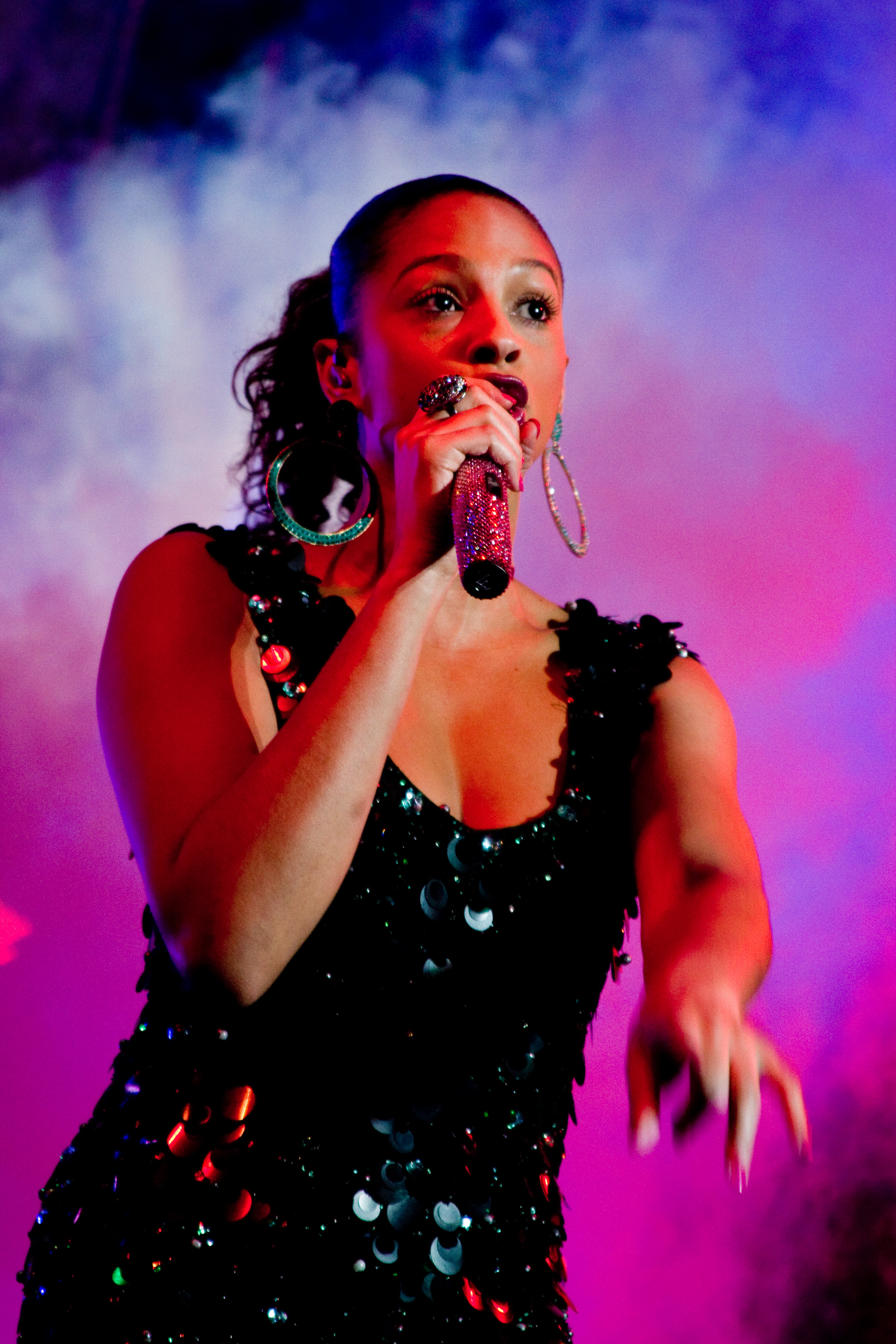
Alesha Dixon

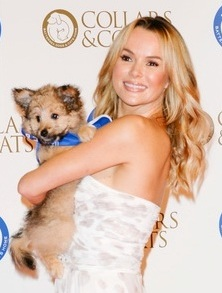
Amanda Holden

Simon Cowell

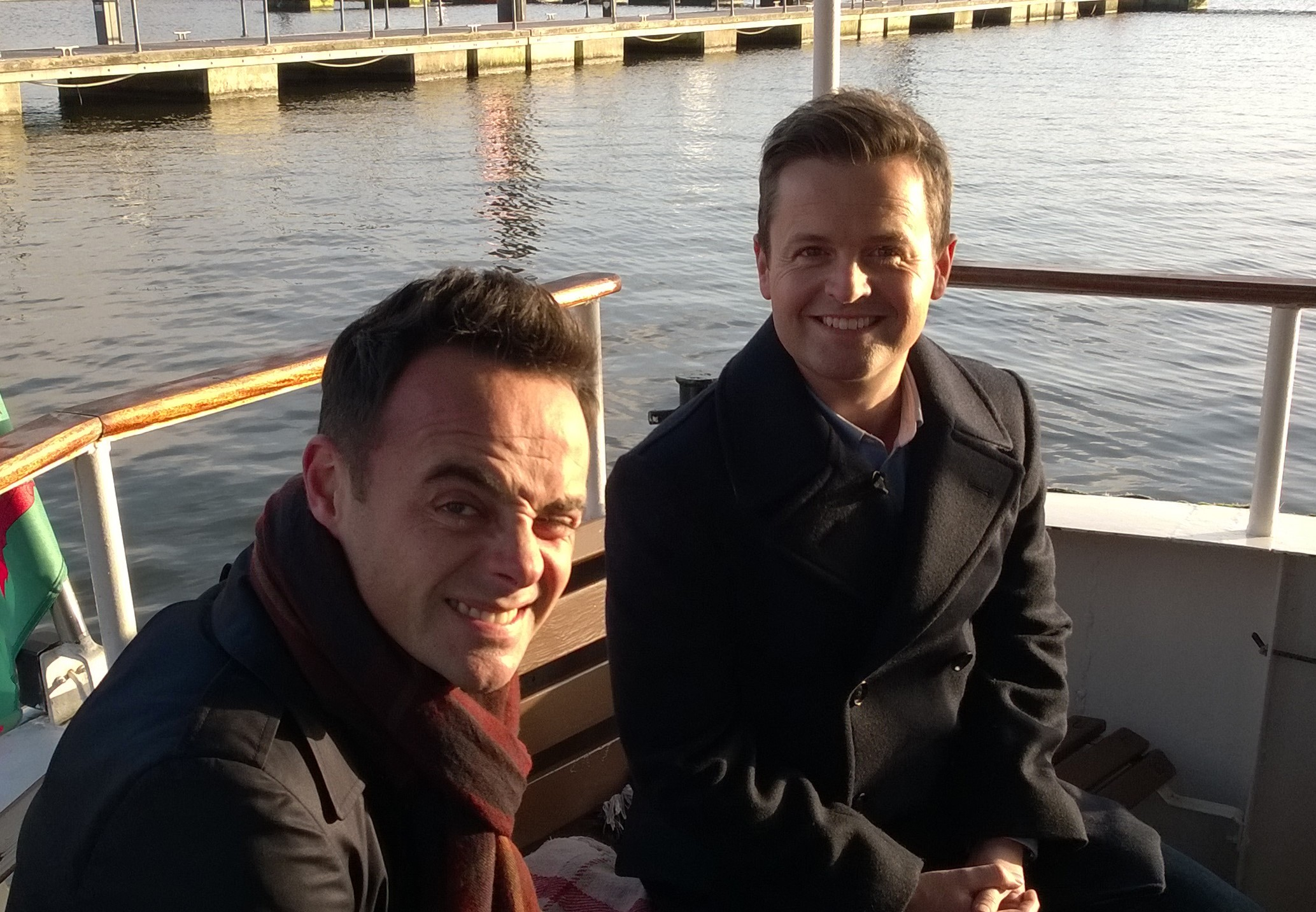
Ant & Dec

== Series overview ==
The fifteenth series was planned for production and broadcast in 2021, yet ITV, Thames and Syco Entertainment were concerned on how to safely conduct filming in the midst of new Government restrictions to combat the COVID-19 pandemic in the United Kingdom. After initially deciding to postpone production until later in the year, all involved parties agreed that they would not produce a new series until the following year, when Government restrictions would be eased and conditions surrounding the pandemic would be favourable for large-scale television production. Auditions were filmed at the London Palladium in January 2022, with Cowell returning after his bicycle accident during the previous series. The deliberations stage took place inside the Radisson Blu Edwardian Hampshire Hotel during February 2022, with Cowell assisting the other three judges remotely from his London house due to him contracting COVID-19.

Winner | Runner-up | Third Place | Semi-finalist
Judges' Wildcard Finalist | Golden Buzzer Audition

Participant	Age(s)	Genre	Performance Type	Semi-final	Finished
5 Star Boys	10–12	Dance	Contemporary Dance Group	4	Finalist
Amber and the Dancing Collies	25	Animals	Dog Act	2	Finalist
Andrew Basso	36	Danger	Escape Artist	2	Eliminated
Aneeshwar Kunchala	7	Variety	Poet	5	Finalist
Axel Blake	33	Comedy	Stand Up Comedian	5	Winner
Ben Nickless	40	Comedy	Impressionist	2	Finalist
Born to Perform	14–24	Dance	Dance Group	1	Eliminated
Brian & Krysstal	71 & 58	Comedy / Music	Comic Music Duo	5	Eliminated
Dame Nation	31–57	Singing	Pantomime Vocal Group	4	Eliminated
Dane Bates Collective	12–27	Dance	Contemporary Dance Group	3	Eliminated
Dante Marvin	13	Comedy / Singing	Comic Singer	2	Eliminated
Eva Abley	14	Comedy	Stand Up Comedian	3	Finalist
Flintz and T4ylor	22 & 17	Singing / Music	Rapper & Pianist	2	Finalist
IMD Legion	11–35	Dance	Street Dance Group	5	Eliminated
Immi Davis	9	Singing	Singer	3	Eliminated
Jamie Leahey	13	Comedy	Ventriloquist	1	Runner-Up
Junwoo	23	Magic	Magician	1	Eliminated
Keiichi Iwasaki	49	Magic	Magician	3	Eliminated
Les Sancho	24–31	Dance	Latin & Hip Hop Dance Group	3	Eliminated
London Community Gospel Choir	28–54	Singing	Gospel Choir	1	Eliminated
Loren Allred	32	Singing	Singer	4	Finalist
Mary P	29	Singing	Mary Poppins Impersonator	4	Eliminated
Matricks Illusion	27 & 29	Magic	Quick Change Group	5	Eliminated
Maxwell Thorpe	32	Singing	Opera Singer	1	Finalist
Mel Day	77	Singing	Singer	1	Eliminated
Nick Edwards	35	Singing / Music	Singer & Guitarist	5	Eliminated
Ranger Chris	41	Dance	Dinosaur Dance Group	2	Eliminated
Ryland Petty	9	Magic	Magician	2	Eliminated
Scooter Boys	6–10	Danger	Scooter Stunt Team	5	Eliminated
Stefano Paolini	45	Comedy	Stand Up Comedian	4	Eliminated
Suzi Wild	34	Comedy	Impressionist	1	Eliminated
The Dots	32–38	Comedy / Singing	Comic Vocal Trio	3	Eliminated
The Freaks	10–36	Acrobatics	Acrobatic Group	3	Eliminated
The Frontline Singers	24–62	Singing	Vocal Group	4	Eliminated
The Phantom	25	Magic	Magician	4	Eliminated
The Witches	17–31	Magic	Horror Magician	1	Eliminated
Titan the Robot	34	Comedy	Comedian	4	Eliminated
Tom Ball	23	Singing	Singer	3	Third place
Voices of Armed Forces Children Choir	6–18	Singing	Choir	2	Eliminated
Welsh of the West End	24–34	Singing	Vocal Group	5	Eliminated

=== Semi-finals summary ===
Buzzed out | Judges' vote | Won the Judges' Vote | Won the Public's Vote
Lost Judges' Vote | Eliminated

==== Semi-final 1 (30 May) ====
Guest performers: Moulin Rouge! The Musical ("Welcome to the Moulin Rouge"/"Backstage Romance")

Semi-Finalist	Order	Performance Type	Buzzes and judges' votes				Percentage	Finished
Semi-Finalist	Order	Performance Type	Cowell	Holden	Dixon	Walliams	Percentage	Finished
Mel Day	1	Singer					3.9%	6th - Eliminated
Born to Perform	2	Dance Group					10.6%	4th - Eliminated
Suzi Wild	3	Impressionist					3.5%	7th - Eliminated
London Community Gospel Choir	4	Gospel Choir					2.8%	8th - Eliminated
The Witches	5	Horror Magician					9.3%	5th - Eliminated
Jamie Leahey	6	Ventriloquist					26.1%	2nd (Judges' Vote tied – Won on Public Vote)
Junwoo	7	Magician					10.8%	3rd (Judges' Vote tied – Lost on Public Vote)
Maxwell Thorpe	8	Opera Singer					33.0%	1st (Won Public Vote)

==== Semi-final 2 (31 May) ====
Guest Performers: Back to the Future: The Musical (with Roger Bart) ("The Power of Love"/"It Works")

Semi-Finalist	Order	Performance Type	Buzzes and judges' votes				Percentage	Finished
Semi-Finalist	Order	Performance Type	Cowell	Holden	Dixon	Walliams	Percentage	Finished
Amber and the Dancing Collies	1	Dog Act					15.8%	2nd (Lost Judges' Vote)^{2}
Voices of Armed Forces Children Choir	2	Choir					12.0%	5th - Eliminated
Ryland Petty	3	Magician					12.4%	4th - Eliminated
Dante Marvin	4	Comic Singer					6.9%	6th - Eliminated
Flintz and T4ylor	5	Rapper & Pianist					15.7%	3rd (Won Judges' Vote)
Ranger Chris	6	Dinosaur Dance Group					3.8%	7th - Eliminated
Ben Nickless	7	Impressionist					30.4%	1st (Won Public Vote)
Andrew Basso	8	Escape Artist					3.0%	8th - Eliminated

- ^2 Amber & Her Dancing Collies were later sent through to the final as the judges' wildcard.

==== Semi-final 3 (1 June) ====
Guest performers: Diversity

Semi-Finalist	Order	Performance Type	Buzzes and judges' votes				Percentage	Finished
Semi-Finalist	Order	Performance Type	Cowell	Holden	Dixon	Walliams	Percentage	Finished
Les Sancho	1	Latin & Hip Hop Dance Group					0.9%	8th - Eliminated
Immi Davis	2	Singer					17.0%	4th - Eliminated
The Freaks	3	Acrobatic Group					7.1%	5th - Eliminated
Dane Bates Collective	4	Contemporary Dance Group					5.6%	6th - Eliminated
Eva Abley	5	Stand Up Comedian	^{3}				20.1%	3rd (Won Judges' Vote)
The Dots	6	Comic Vocal Trio					1.1%	7th - Eliminated
Keiichi Iwasaki	7	Magician					22.0%	2nd (Lost Judges' Vote)
Tom Ball	8	Singer					26.2%	1st (Won Public Vote)

- ^3Due to the majority vote for Eva Abley, Cowell's voting intention was not revealed.

==== Semi-final 4 (2 June) ====
Guest performers: Emeli Sandé and Kseniya Simonova ("Brighter Days")

Semi-Finalist	Order	Performance Type	Buzzes and judges' votes				Percentage	Finished
Semi-Finalist	Order	Performance Type	Cowell	Holden	Dixon	Walliams	Percentage	Finished
Dame Nation	1	Pantomime Vocal Group	^{4}				2.8%	8th - Eliminated
5 Star Boys	2	Contemporary Dance Group	^{5}				24.5%	2nd (Won Judges' Vote)
The Frontline Singers	3	Vocal Group					12.9%	4th - Eliminated
Mary P	4	Mary Poppins Impersonator					10.6%	5th - Eliminated
The Phantom	5	Illusionist					14.5%	3rd (Lost Judges' Vote)
Stefano Paolini	6	Stand Up Comedian					3.0%	7th - Eliminated
Titan The Robot	7	Stand Up Comedian					5.4%	6th - Eliminated
Loren Allred	8	Singer					26.3%	1st (Won Public Vote)

- ^4Cowell requested his X was removed after the act during his comments.
- ^5Cowell did not cast his vote due to the majority support for 5 Star Boys from the other judges, but admitted that his voting intention would have been for this semi-finalist.

==== Semi-final 5 (3 June) ====
Guest performers: Jon Courtenay, Colin Thackery, D-Day Darlings and D-Day Juniors

Semi-Finalist	Order	Performance Type	Buzzes and judges' votes				Percentage	Finished
Semi-Finalist	Order	Performance Type	Cowell	Holden	Dixon	Walliams	Percentage	Finished
Matricks Illusion	1	Quick Change Group					1.3%	8th - Eliminated
Scooter Boys	2	Scooter Stunt Team					12.3%	4th - Eliminated
Welsh of the West End	3	Vocal Group	^{7}				13.4%	3rd (Lost Judges' Vote)
Aneeshwar Kunchala	4	Poet	^{7}				14.0%	2nd (Won Judges' Vote)
Brian & Krysstal	5	Comic Music Duo					2.1%	7th - Eliminated
IMD Legion	6	Street Dance Group					8.5%	6th - Eliminated
Nick Edwards	7	Singer & Guitarist					9.9%	5th - Eliminated
Axel Blake	8	Stand Up Comedian					38.5%	1st (Won Public Vote)

- ^7Cowell did not cast his vote due to the majority support for Aneeshwar Kunchala from the other judges; he stated that he would have wanted to see both Kunchala and Welsh of the West End in the final, implying that he would have tried to take the result to the public vote if he had been asked earlier.

=== Final (5 June) ===
Guest performers: Sister Act The Musical ("Raise Your Voice")

Winner | Runner-up

Finalist	Order	Performance Type	Percentage	Finished
Jamie Leahey	1	Ventriloquist	14.7%	2nd
Amber and the Dancing Collies	2	Dog Act	3.2%	10th
5 Star Boys	3	Contemporary Dance Group	2.5%	11th
Flintz and T4ylor	4	Rapper & Pianist	8.3%	6th
Aneeshwar Kunchala	5	Poet	6.0%	7th
Eva Abley	6	Stand Up Comedian	8.4%	5th
Tom Ball	7	Singer	14.2%	3rd
Ben Nickless	8	Impressionist	5.7%	8th
Loren Allred	9	Singer	3.3%	9th
Axel Blake	10	Stand Up Comedian	19.7%	1st
Maxwell Thorpe	11	Opera Singer	14.0%	4th

== Ratings ==
Episode	Air date	Total viewers (millions)	ITV Weekly rank
Auditions 1	16 April	8.31	2
Auditions 2	17 April	6.94	3
Auditions 3	23 April	7.03	4
Auditions 4	30 April	7.29	1
Auditions 5	7 May	6.93	1
Auditions 6	14 May	6.55	1
Auditions 7	21 May	7.00	1
Auditions 8	28 May	5.84	1
Semi-Final 1	30 May	5.89	2
Semi-Final 2	31 May	5.46	3
Semi-Final 3	1 June	5.06	9
Semi-Final 4	2 June	4.70	11
Semi-Final 5	3 June	5.23	6
Final	5 June	7.07	1
