= America's Got Talent season 15 =

America's Got Talent
- Season 15
- Promotional poster for season 15, featuring (L to R) host Crews alongside judges Cowell, Vergara, Klum, and Mandel
- Showrunners: Jason Raff; Sam Donnelly
- Hosted by: Terry Crews
- Judges: Howie Mandel; Heidi Klum; Sofía Vergara; Simon Cowell
- Winner: Brandon Leake
- Runner-up: Broken Roots
- Finals venue: Universal Studios Hollywood
- No. of episodes: 25

Release
- Original network: NBC
- Original release: May 26 – September 23, 2020

Season chronology
- ← Previous; Season 14 Next → Season 16

Judges and Host for America's Got Talent Season 15

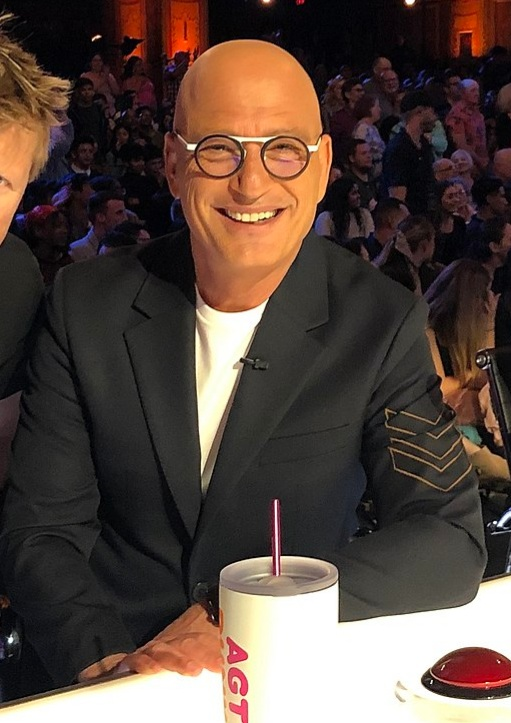
Howie Mandel

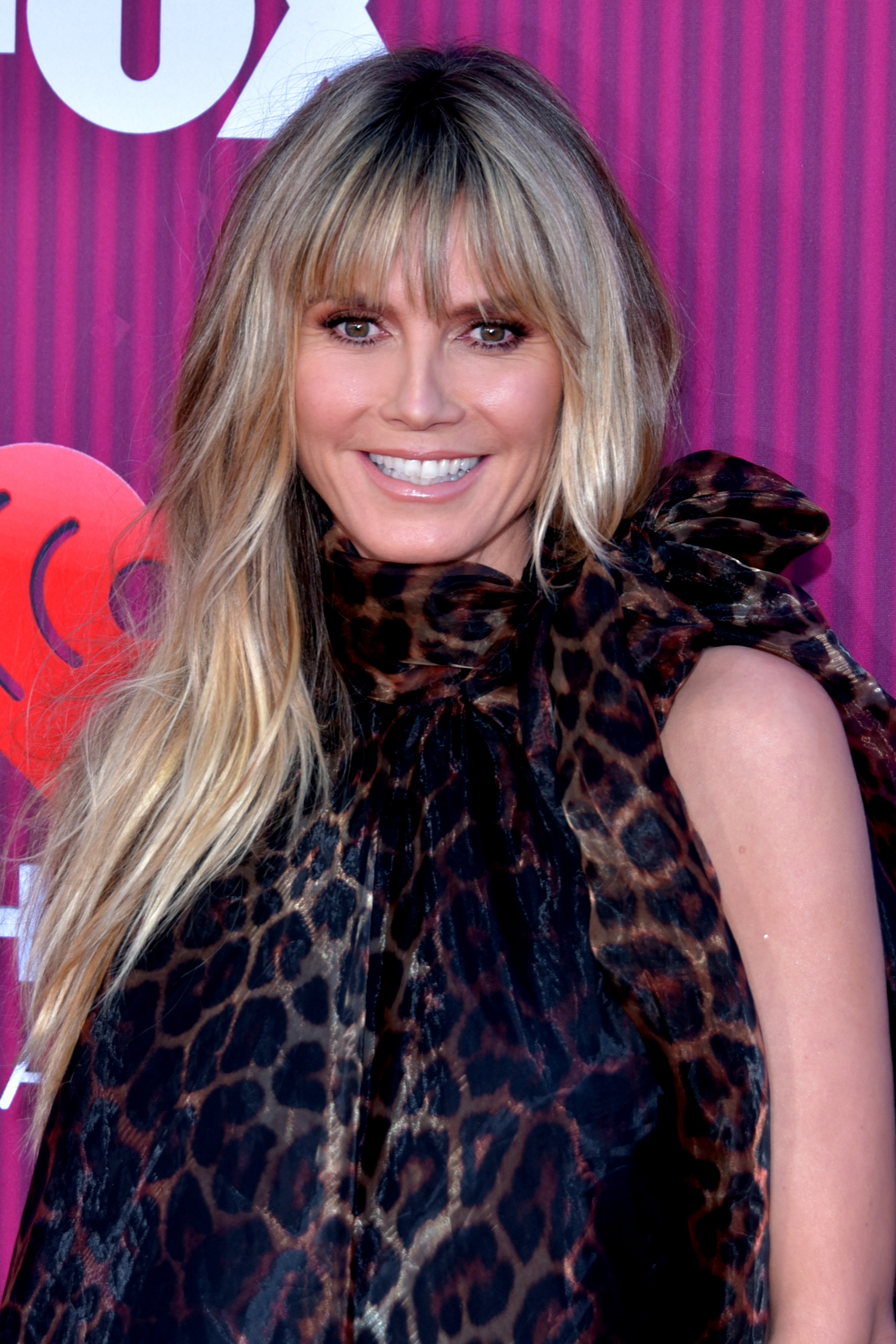
Heidi Klum

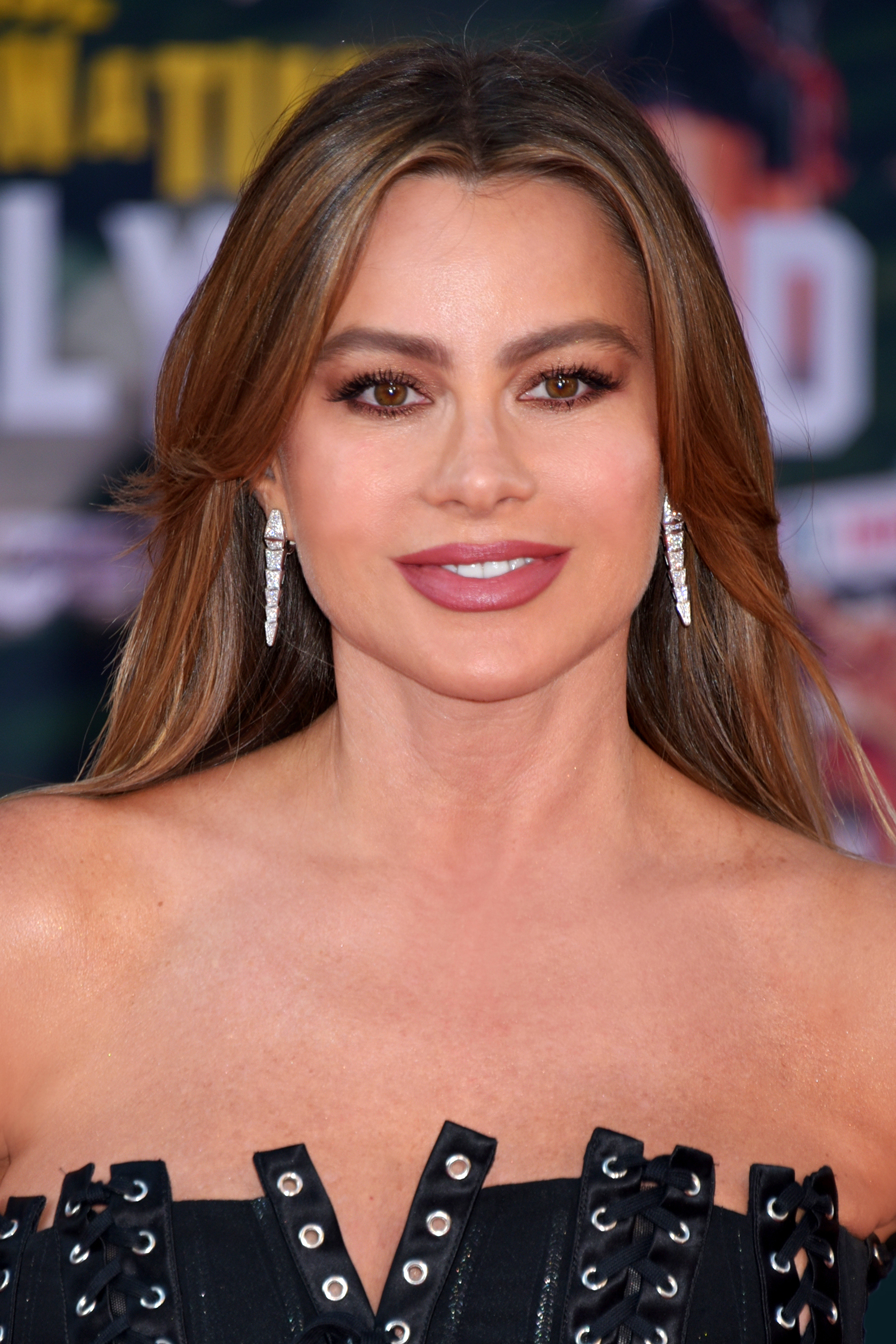
Sofía Vergara

Simon Cowell

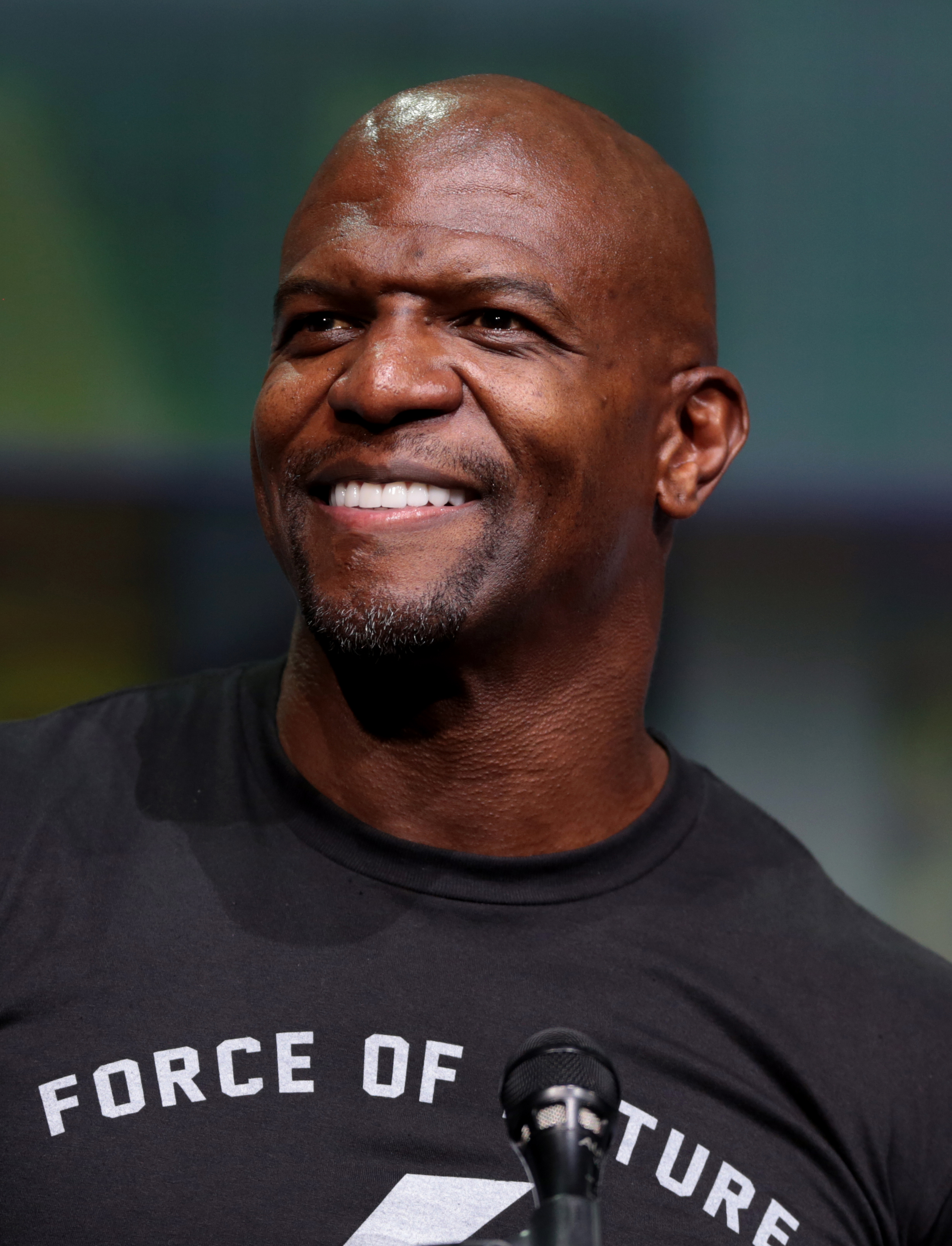
Terry Crews

The fifteenth season of the American talent show competition series America's Got Talent was broadcast on NBC from May 26 to September 23, 2020. Following the previous season, both Julianne Hough and Gabrielle Union left the program, leading to both being replaced prior to filming. Heidi Klum was brought back to resume her former role, while Sofía Vergara was hired to join her as a new judge on the judging panel. Simon Cowell missed the live shows, after sustaining an injury in August. While the first two quarter-finals featured guest judges in his place, the remainder of the live episodes were conducted without any further stand-ins.

The fifteenth season was impacted by the COVID-19 pandemic that hit the United States in 2020, which affected arrangements for pre-recorded and live episodes. While most audition episodes had been filmed by the end of April (despite minor issues), remaining episodes were disrupted, but resumed after safety measures were implemented to prevent the risk of the infection spreading among staff and participants. Format changes included the use of a virtual audience for the live rounds, an alteration in the program's broadcast schedule for that year, and a revamp to the format for the Judge Cuts round that would condense it into a single episode while featuring no guest judges as in previous seasons.

The fifteenth season was won by spoken word poet Brandon Leake, with singing guitarists duo Broken Roots finishing second, and singer Cristina Rae placing third. During its broadcast, the season averaged around 6.61 million viewers.

== Season overview ==
Open auditions were held in late 2019, with closed auditions held across January to March the following year. Prior to the main auditions taking place, replacements were made for Julianne Hough and Gabrielle Union, who had been let go following the conclusion of the previous season. On February 27, 2020, it was announced that Heidi Klum would return as judge, in addition to newcomer Sofía Vergara.

The season was impacted as a result of the COVID-19 pandemic, which affected television and film shoots across the globe. Although it had been partially disrupted by Klum falling ill, leading to Eric Stonestreet standing in for her during an audition session, restrictions imposed by the United States to combat the spread of COVID-19 caused the program to initially move to filming without an audience present at auditions (before production was ultimately suspended). Additional auditions were later allowed, but these had to be conducted online as a safety precaution. By April 27, the season would broadcast as planned and premiere on May 26, with the season featuring a hiatus after the audition episodes had been aired with the footage that had already been filmed.

In mid-June, production of the season resumed following changes in guidelines for media production by Californian state government, and discussions between industry unions, producers and local officials. While the Judges Cuts stage was held at an outdoor venue in Simi Valley, California, it required implementing several health and safety protocols including: performances conducted via videoconferencing on a cinema screen, masks being mandatory for all personnel when off-camera, enforced social distancing and regular testing of staff. The format was also changed with the number of participants for this stage reduced from seventy-two to sixty. No guest judges or Golden Buzzers were involved, and each participant were given a verdict after their performance. Cowell notably approved the change in format, including the decision to condense all footage taken into a single episode, having disliked the arrangement used in previous seasons.

By the end of July, a decision on how to produce the live round episodes was reached to include a virtual audience for these rounds. Applications were made available within the week of July 28, in order to maintain safe working conditions, with Universal Studios Hollywood chosen as the venue for performances to take place within. This included an expansion in the number of quarter-finalists for the season, an additional quarter-final, and a change to the number of semi-finalists that each quarter-final had. Prior to the first quarter-final's live broadcast, Cowell had an accident that left him with a severe back injury. After undergoing surgery to help repair the damage, he stepped-down from the live episodes until doctors approved his return. Guest judges appeared during Cowell's absence for the first two quarter-finals, before deciding to have the remaining live episodes stick to using a judging panel of three.

Of the participants who auditioned for this season, forty-four secured a place in the live quarter-finals, with eleven quarter-finalists in each one. Among these included: singer Roberta Battaglia, choir Voices of our City Choir, spoken word poet Brandon Leake and singer Cristina Rae and dance group W.A.F.F.L.E. Crew, who had each received a Golden Buzzer from the main judges and host. About twenty-two quarter-finalists advanced and were split between the two semi-finals, with ten semi-finalists securing a place in the finals. The following below lists the results of each participant's overall performance in this season:

Winner | Runner-up | Third place | Finalist | Semi-finalist
Quarter-finalist | Wildcard Semi-finalist | Golden Buzzer Audition

Participant	Age(s) ^{1}	Genre	Act	From	Quarter-Final	Result
Alan Silva	38	Acrobatics	Aerialist	Las Vegas	3	Grand-finalist
Alex Hooper	35	Comedy	Comedian	Baltimore, Maryland	4	Eliminated
Alexis Brownley & The Puppy Pals	9	Animals	Dog Act	Weston, Florida	2	Eliminated
Annie Jones	12	Singing	Singer	Victoria, Australia	3	Eliminated
Archie Williams	59	Singing	Singer	Baton Rouge, Louisiana	1	Finalist
BAD Salsa	16 & 21	Dance	Salsa Dance Duo	India	2	Finalist
Bello & Annaliese Nock	51 & 23	Danger	Daredevil Duo	Sarasota, Florida	1	Eliminated
Bello Sisters	14-22	Acrobatics	Acrobatic Trio	Italy	4	Finalist
BONAVEGA	31	Singing	Singer	Toledo, Ohio	2	Eliminated
Bone Breakers	22–24	Acrobatics / Dance	Contortion Dance Group	Conakry, Republic of Guinea	3	Eliminated
Brandon Leake	27	Variety	Poet	Stockton, California	4	Winner
Brett Loudermilk	31	Danger	Sword Swallower	North Carolina	1	Semi-finalist
Broken Roots ^{2}	38 & 44	Singing / Music	Singing & Guitarist Duo	Chicago	4	Runner-up
C.A. Wildcats	13–29	Acrobatics / Dance	Cheerleading Group	Dallas	4	Eliminated
Celina Graves	30	Singing	Singer	San Diego, California	4	Semi-finalist
Cristina Rae	30	Singing	Singer	Nashville	3	Third place
Dance Town Family	8-35	Dance	Dance Group	Miami	3	Semi-finalist
Daneliya Tuleshova	14	Singing	Singer	Almaty, Kazakhstan	2	Finalist
Divas & Drummers of Compton	3-20	Dance / Music	Dance & Percussion Group	Compton, California	4	Eliminated
Double Dragon	32	Singing	Singing Duo	San Francisco	1	Semi-finalist
Feng E	13	Music	Ukulelist	Taipei, Taiwan	1	Eliminated
FrenchieBabyy	25	Acrobatics / Dance	Contortionist Dancer	Fairfield, California	1	Eliminated
Jonathan Goodwin	40	Danger	Daredevil	Pembrokeshire, United Kingdom	2	Semi-finalist
Kameron Ross	30	Singing	Country Singer	Dallas	2	Eliminated
Kelvin Dukes	14	Singing	Singer	Burtonsville, Maryland	2	Eliminated
Kenadi Dodds	15	Singing / Music	Singer & Pianist	Salt Lake City, Utah	4	Finalist
Lightwave Theatre Company	32–35	Variety	Puppeteer Group	Bucharest, Romania	4	Eliminated
Malik Dope	27	Music	Drummer	Washington, D.C.	3	Semi-finalist
Max Major	33	Magic	Magician	Las Vegas	3	Semi-finalist
Michael Yo	45	Comedy	Comedian	Houston	1	Eliminated
Noah Epps	12	Dance	Dancer	Virginia	4	Eliminated
Nolan Neal	39	Singing / Music	Singer & Guitarist	Nashville, Tennessee	3	Eliminated
Pork Chop Revue	9-68	Animals	Pig Act	Miami	1	Eliminated
Resound	26–30	Singing	Vocal Trio	Richmond, Virginia	4	Eliminated
Roberta Battaglia	11	Singing	Singer	Toronto	1	Grand-finalist
Shaquira McGrath	26	Singing	Singer	Kennesaw, Georgia	1	Semi-finalist
Sheldon Riley	21	Singing	Singer	Sydney, Australia	3	Eliminated
Simon & Maria	12 & 10	Dance	Salsa Dance Duo	Colombia	1	Eliminated
Spyros Brothers	23 & 25	Variety	Diabolo Duo	New York City	2	Semi-finalist
The Shape	15–19	Dance	Dance Group	Alhambra, California	2	Eliminated
Thomas Day	17	Singing	Singer	Brentwood, California	—N/a ^{3}	Semi-finalist
Usama Siddiquee	29	Comedy	Comedian	New York City	3	Eliminated
Vincent Marcus	32	Comedy / Music	Impressionist	Los Angeles	2	Eliminated
Voices of our City Choir	21–80	Singing	Choir	San Diego	2	Semi-finalist
W.A.F.F.L.E. Crew	23–26	Dance	Dance Group	New York City	3	Semi-finalist

- ^1 Ages denoted for a participant(s), pertain to their final performance for this season.
- ^2 This act initially failed to pass through the Judge Cuts stage, but was later brought back for the quarter-finals after a quarter-finalist was forced to drop out.
- ^3 This participant initially pulled out from the contest for health reasons before the quarter-finals, but later returned as a Wildcard act for the semi-finals after being given the all clear by producers.

=== Quarter-finals summary ===
Buzzed Out | Judges' choice | Advanced to Semi-finals
Won Online Public Vote | Won Judges' Vote | Lost Judges' Vote

==== Quarter-final 1 (August 11) ====
Guest Performers, Results Show: Mat Franco and Kodi Lee

Quarter-Finalist	Order	Buzzes and Judges' votes				Result (August 12)
Quarter-Finalist	Order	Clarkson ^{4}	Vergara	Klum	Mandel	Result (August 12)
Pork Chop Revue	1					Eliminated
Feng E	2					Eliminated (Lost Judges' Vote)
Shaquira McGrath	3					Advanced
Simon and Maria	4					Eliminated
FrenchieBabyy	5					Eliminated
Bello & Annaliese Nock	6					Eliminated
Roberta Battaglia	7					Advanced
Michael Yo	8					Eliminated
Double Dragon	9					Advanced (Won Judges' Vote)
Brett Loudermilk	10					Advanced (Online Public Vote)
Archie Williams	11					Advanced

- ^4 Kelly Clarkson filled in for Simon Cowell while he recovered from a back injury sustained prior to August 11.

==== Quarter-final 2 (August 18) ====
Guest Performers, Results Show: Darci Lynne and Jabbawockeez

Quarter-Finalist	Order	Buzzes and Judges' votes				Result (August 19)
Quarter-Finalist	Order	Thompson ^{5}	Vergara	Klum	Mandel	Result (August 19)
Kelvin Dukes	1					Eliminated
The Shape	2					Eliminated
Kameron Ross	3					Eliminated
BAD Salsa	4					Advanced
Vincent Marcus	5					Eliminated
Alexis Brownley	6					Eliminated (Judges' Vote Tied - Lost by Public Vote)
BONAVEGA	7					Eliminated
Spyros Brothers	8					Advanced (Online Public Vote)
Daneliya Tuleshova	9					Advanced
Jonathan Goodwin	10					Advanced (Judges' Vote Tied - Won by Public Vote)
Voices of our City Choir	11					Advanced

- ^5 Kenan Thompson filled in for Simon Cowell while he continued to recover from a back injury sustained prior to August 11.

==== Quarter-final 3 (August 25) ====
Guest Performer, Results Show: Jon Dorenbos

Quarter-Finalist	Order	Buzzes and Judges' votes			Result (August 26)
Quarter-Finalist	Order	Vergara	Mandel	Klum	Result (August 26)
Dance Town Family ^{6}	1				Eliminated
Nolan Neal	2				Eliminated (Lost Judges' Vote)
Usama Siddiquee	3				Eliminated
W.A.F.F.L.E. Crew	4				Advanced (Online Public Vote)
Annie Jones	5				Eliminated
Malik Dope	6				Advanced (Won Judges' Vote)
Max Major	7				Advanced
Bone Breakers	8				Eliminated
Sheldon Riley	9				Eliminated
Alan Silva	10				Advanced
Cristina Rae	11				Advanced

- ^6 Dance Town Family were later brought back as a Wildcard act for the Semi-finals.

==== Quarter-final 4 (September 1) ====
Guest Performers, Results Show: Cam and Duo Transcend

Quarter-Finalist	Order	Buzzes and Judges' votes			Result (September 2)
Quarter-Finalist	Order	Vergara	Mandel	Klum	Result (September 2)
C.A. Wildcats	1				Eliminated
Kenadi Dodds	2				Advanced
Lightwave Theatre Company	3				Eliminated
Resound	4				Eliminated (Lost Judges' Vote)
Divas & Drummers of Compton	5				Eliminated
Celina Graves	6				Advanced (Online Public Vote)
Noah Epps	7				Eliminated
Alex Hooper	8				Eliminated
Broken Roots	9				Advanced
Bello Sisters	10				Advanced (Won Judges' Vote)
Brandon Leake	11				Advanced

=== Semi-finals summary ===
Buzzed Out | Judges' choice | Advanced to Finals
Won Online Public Vote | Won Judges' Vote | Lost Judges' Vote

==== Semi-final 1 (September 8) ====
Guest Performers, Results Show: Piff the Magic Dragon, David Copperfield, and Ndlovu Youth Choir

Semi-Finalist	Order	Buzzes and Judges' votes			Result (September 9)
Semi-Finalist	Order	Vergara	Mandel	Klum	Result (September 9)
Double Dragon	1				Eliminated
Dance Town Family	2				Eliminated
Broken Roots	3				Advanced
Spyros Brothers	4				Eliminated
Thomas Day	5				Eliminated
Alan Silva	6				Advanced (Online Public Vote)
Shaquira McGrath	7				Eliminated
Brandon Leake	8				Advanced
Malik Dope	9				Eliminated (Lost Judges' Vote)
Archie Williams	10				Advanced (Won Judges' Vote)
Roberta Battaglia	11				Advanced

==== Semi-final 2 (September 15) ====
Guest Performers, Results Show: BTS and Colin Cloud

Semi-Finalist	Order	Buzzes and Judges' votes			Result (September 16)
Semi-Finalist	Order	Vergara	Mandel	Klum	Result (September 16)
W.A.F.F.L.E. Crew	1				Eliminated
Kenadi Dodds	2				Advanced (Online Public Vote)
Max Major	3			^{7}	Eliminated (Lost Judges' Vote)
Bello Sisters	4				Advanced
Celina Graves	5				Eliminated
Jonathan Goodwin	6				Eliminated
Cristina Rae	7				Advanced
BAD Salsa	8			^{7}	Advanced (Won Judges' Vote)
Voices of our City Choir	9				Eliminated
Brett Loudermilk	10				Eliminated
Daneliya Tuleshova	11				Advanced

- ^7 Due to the majority vote for BAD Salsa, Klum's voting intention was not revealed.

=== Finals (September 22–23) ===
Guest Performers, Finale: David Dobrik, Detroit Youth Choir, Meghan Markle, and Usher

Winner | Runner-up | 3rd place | Top 5

Finalist	Performed with (2nd Performance)	Result (September 23)
Alan Silva	Bishop Briggs and Deadly Games ^{8}	Grand-finalist
Archie Williams	Marvin Winans	Finalist
BAD Salsa	V.Unbeatable	Finalist
Bello Sisters	Bishop Briggs and Deadly Games ^{8}	Finalist
Brandon Leake	N/A	1st
Broken Roots	Blake Shelton	2nd
Cristina Rae	OneRepublic	3rd
Daneliya Tuleshova	Ava Max	Finalist
Kenadi Dodds	JP Saxe and Julia Michaels ^{9}	Finalist
Roberta Battaglia	JP Saxe and Julia Michaels ^{9}	Grand-finalist

- ^8 Alan Silva and Bello Sisters conducted a joint routine for their second performance, and thus shared the same guest performers.
- ^9 Kenadi Dodds and Roberta Battaglia conducted a joint routine for their second performance, and thus shared the same guest performers.

== Ratings ==
Viewership and ratings per episode of America's Got Talent season 15
No.	Title	Air date	Rating (18–49)	Viewers (millions)	DVR (18–49)	DVR viewers (millions)	Total (18–49)	Total viewers (millions)	Ref.
1	"Auditions 1"	May 26, 2020	1.5	9.88	0.4	2.11	1.9	11.98	
2	"Auditions 2"	June 2, 2020	1.3	8.75	0.4	2.12	1.7	10.87	
3	"Auditions 3"	June 9, 2020	1.3	8.63	0.3	1.85	1.7	10.48	
4	"Auditions 4"	June 16, 2020	1.3	8.57	0.4	2.13	1.7	10.70	
5	"Auditions 5"	June 23, 2020	1.3	8.72	0.4	2.09	1.7	10.81	
6	"Auditions 6"	June 30, 2020	1.2	8.44	0.4	1.95	1.6	10.39	
7	"Auditions 7"	July 14, 2020	1.1	7.63	0.4	1.91	1.5	9.54	
8	"AGT: Best of Auditions"	July 21, 2020	0.7	5.08	0.1	0.60	0.8	5.68	
9	"Judge Cuts"	July 28, 2020	1.0	6.12	0.2	1.30	1.2	7.42	
10	"AGT: 15th Anniversary Special"	August 4, 2020	0.8	6.16	0.2	1.01	1.0	7.17	
11	"Live Show 1"	August 11, 2020	0.9	6.75	0.3	1.55	1.2	8.30	
12	"Results Show 1"	August 12, 2020	0.7	6.15	0.2	1.23	0.9	7.38	
13	"Live Show 2"	August 18, 2020	0.7	5.58	0.2	1.25	0.9	6.83	
14	"Results Show 2"	August 19, 2020	0.6	5.14	0.1	1.05	0.8	6.19	
15	"Live Show 3"	August 25, 2020	0.7	5.63	TBD	TBD	TBD	TBD	
16	"Results Show 3"	August 26, 2020	0.6	5.00	TBD	TBD	TBD	TBD	
17	"Live Show 4"	September 1, 2020	0.8	6.40	TBD	TBD	TBD	TBD	
18	"Results Show 4"	September 2, 2020	0.6	5.66	TBD	TBD	TBD	TBD	
19	"Semi-Finals 1"	September 8, 2020	0.8	6.01	TBD	TBD	TBD	TBD	
20	"Results Show 5"	September 9, 2020	0.6	5.50	TBD	TBD	TBD	TBD	
21	"Semi-Finals 2"	September 15, 2020	0.7	5.94	TBD	TBD	TBD	TBD	
22	"Results Show 6"	September 16, 2020	0.6	5.33	TBD	TBD	TBD	TBD	
23	"Live Finals"	September 22, 2020	0.8	6.16	TBD	TBD	TBD	TBD	
24	"Countdown to the Finale"	September 23, 2020	0.7	5.48	TBD	TBD	TBD	TBD	
25	"Live Finale Results"	September 23, 2020	0.9	6.57	TBD	TBD	TBD	TBD	
