= Brandon Leake =

American spoken word poet (born 1992)

Brandon Leake (born May 4, 1992) is an American spoken word poet, educator and motivational speaker and the winner of the fifteenth season of America's Got Talent. He was the first spoken–word poet to be on America's Got Talent and received the Golden Buzzer award in the first round from Howie Mandel. He performed pieces about his sister who died, his father, his mother and his daughter. He was named the champion of the fifteenth season on September 23, 2020, going home with a $1 million cash prize, a brand new Kia Stinger and the opportunity to star in Luxor Las Vegas. Leake used his winnings to pay his student loan debt.

He has performed in thirty-six US states, New Zealand, Mexico and Canada with his Dark Side Tour to promote his published poetry and his album called Deficiencies: A Tale from My Dark Side. He teaches at Brookside school daycare center, where he worked with his wife. Leake is the founder and CEO of Called to Move, an organization that helps youth through poetry. He founded the organization in 2012 at Simpson University. He is also an academic advisor at San Joaquin Delta College. On October 9, 2020, it was announced that Leake had signed with United Talent Agency. Also in October 2020, it was announced Leake would serve as the producing partner and contributor to the Team Harmony Foundation's new international web series, HATE: WHAT ARE YOU GOING TO DO?

Leake re-participated in America's Got Talent: All-Stars in 2023 but was eliminated before the Finals.

Leake is from Stockton, California. He is married and has two kids one daughter and one son, who was born shortly before his first audition.

Preceded by Kodi Lee	America's Got Talent winner Season 15 (Summer 2020)	Succeeded by Dustin Tavella
