= Kodi Lee =

American singer, musician, and savant (born 1996)

- Born: Kodi Taehyun Lee; July 7, 1996 (age 30); Temecula, California, U.S.
- Genres: Pop; electropop
- Occupations: Singer; songwriter; musician
- Instruments: Vocals; piano; keyboards
- Years active: 2010–present
- Labels: Kodster; Virgin Music Group
- Website: www.kodileerocks.com

Kodi Taehyun Lee (born July 7, 1996) is an American singer, songwriter, musician, and autistic savant. At 22, he rose to fame on the 14th season of America's Got Talent.

Autistic and legally blind, Kodi Lee rose to fame after being a contestant, and ultimately the winner of the 14th season of America's Got Talent. Within weeks of his performance, Lee's audition reached over 300 million views across the internet.

== Early life ==
Kodi Lee was born to a Korean father and an Indonesian-American mother. Born with optic nerve hypoplasia, he is legally blind. He was diagnosed with autism at an early age and in many ways is severely disabled, such as being unable to dress himself without assistance. He also has Addison's disease. His musical talents were recognized in early childhood, and Lee was featured in a 2008 news story from his adopted hometown of Tooele, Utah regarding his performances with the group Kodi and the Chillbodis Band.

Lee is widely regarded as a musical savant, a person with a developmental disorder who manifests profound ability and talent.

== America's Got Talent ==
=== Season 14 ===
On May 28, 2019, Kodi Lee auditioned for America's Got Talent during season 14. He performed Leon Russell's "A Song for You". Lee received a standing ovation by all four judges and the audience. At the end of his audition, Gabrielle Union pressed the Golden Buzzer, sending him straight through to the live shows.

In the quarterfinals, Lee performed Simon and Garfunkel's "Bridge over Troubled Water", and advanced to the semifinals.

In the semifinals, Lee performed "You Are the Reason" by Calum Scott. During the results, he was announced as one of the ten finalists for the season.

In the finals, he performed "Lost Without You" by Freya Ridings.

In the finale that aired on September 18, 2019, he performed "You Are the Reason" again, with special guest Leona Lewis. At the end of the program, Lee was announced the winner of season 14, having received the most votes. He is the first autistic and developmentally disabled person to win the show.

=== Post AGT ===
In July 2022, Cowell ranked Lee at the 3rd place in his favorite Top 15 Golden Buzzer moments in AGT history. A month later, Lee performed a duet of "Don't Stop Believin'" with Teddy Swims along with guitarist Neal Schon, the founder of the band Journey, during the AGT Qualifiers 3 Results episode. Since 2022, Lee partnered with the Doug Flutie Jr. Foundation for Autism (named after the son of the former NFL football quarterback) by launching a music scholarship program known as the "Kodi Lee Gives Back Grant" designed to help autistic teens and young adults pursue their dreams in the fine arts and has performed in Flutie Foundation shows and concerts since his collaboration.

In January 2023, Lee and Colin Hay released "Hello World." This song got rave reviews and has been well received. This song is Lee's second original release, preceded by his first, "Miracle." That same month, he participated in America's Got Talent: All-Stars. He received more votes than season 15 winner Brandon Leake and comedian Josh Blue, advancing him to the finale. In the finale, he finished just outside the top five.

In 2024, Lee participated in America's Got Talent: Fantasy League, initially being mentored by Simon Cowell. However, during the semi-final episode, Lee received Howie Mandel's Golden Buzzer, drafting him to Mandel's team and sending him directly to the finals. Despite this, he did not finish in the final five of the competition. Also that year, Lee headlined the America's Got Talent presents Superstars Live show at the Luxor Theater in the Luxor Hotel, Las Vegas, Nevada. The last show was broadcast on May 11, 2024.

Preceded by Shin Lim	America's Got Talent winner Season 14 (Summer 2019)	Succeeded by Brandon Leake
