= Ron Sharpe =

Ron Sharpe may refer to:

- Ron Sharpe (baseball) (1905–1972), South Australian baseball player
- Ron Sharpe (businessman) (1950–2021), Australian civil engineer and director
- Ron Sharpe, of the American family musical group Sharpe Family Singers

== See also ==
- Day'Ron Sharpe (born 2001), American NBA player
