= Nightbirde =

American singer (1990–2022)

- Also known as: Jane Marczewski-Claudio; Jane Claudio
- Born: Jane Kristen Marczewski; December 29, 1990; Zanesville, Ohio, U.S.
- Died: February 19, 2022 (aged 31) San Clemente, California, U.S.
- Genres: Pop, electropop, folk
- Occupation: Singer-songwriter
- Instruments: Vocals, piano, acoustic guitar
- Years active: 2011–2022
- Spouse: Jeremy Claudio (m. 2015; div. 2020)
- Website: www.nightbirde.co

Jane Kristen Marczewski (December 29, 1990 – February 19, 2022), better known by her stage name Nightbirde, was an American singer-songwriter.

Previously having released two EPs and several singles, Nightbirde auditioned on America's Got Talent in 2021, where she received a Golden Buzzer for her original song "It's OK". However, she decided to withdraw from AGT before the quarterfinals, because of worsening health due to cancer.

Marczewski died on February 19, 2022. She was 31 years old. Nightbirde's music has been released posthumously by her family.

== Early life and education ==
Marczewski was born on December 29, 1990. She was originally from Zanesville, Ohio, and had three siblings. Marczewski started songwriting at age six, when she helped her mother finish the lyrics for a song. As a young Christian, she volunteered and participated in various church ministries.

Marczewski was a 2009 graduate of Licking County Christian Academy, and graduated from Liberty University (in Lynchburg, Virginia) with a marketing communications degree.

== Music career ==
Marczewski uploaded her first songs, and gave her first live performance in 2011, while a student at Liberty University. She released a three-song EP in 2012, called Lines, on which she sang and played acoustic guitar. In 2013, she released Ocean & Sky, a six-song EP that she funded on Kickstarter.

Remaining in Lynchburg after graduating, Marczewski was a popular performer locally. She returned to Ohio in 2014, then moved to Nashville following her marriage to musician Jeremy Claudio in 2015. She resumed performing under her married name, Jane Claudio, with her husband acting as her producer. Credited as Jane Marczewski-Claudio, she contributed music for the 2015 documentary film, Leonard Knight: A Man & His Mountain.

Nightbirde adopted her professional stage name based on a recurring dream, in which birds sang outside her window at night in anticipation of the morning. She explained: "It felt so poetic that these birds were singing as if it were morning, and yet there was no sign of it yet, and that’s what I want to embody." When asked the meaning behind her name by a fan on Instagram, Nightbirde responded:

Woke up in the night three times, dreaming of birds singing in the dark. The third time, I went to the window and they were there singing morning songs at 3am. I wanted to be one of them singing as if it was morning, though I couldn't see it yet.

Nightbirde's style, a mix of folk and pop, evolved into electropop. Her first single as Nightbirde was "Girl in a Bubble", released in March 2019, along with a music video. In April 2019, she opened for Tori Kelly at Liberty University. In August 2020, following her second cancer diagnosis and remission, she released "It's OK" (her most popular song).

Nightbirde peaked at No. 3 on the Billboard "Emerging Artists" chart in June 2021. Her song "New Year's Eve (The Remix)" peaked at No. 14 on iTunes in December 2021. It also charted in the United Kingdom, Canada and Australia.

=== America's Got Talent ===
In June 2021, Nightbirde performed during the 16th season auditions on America's Got Talent. During her appearance, she offered two inspirational statements:

It's important that everyone knows I'm so much more than the bad things that happen to me... You can't wait until life isn't hard anymore before you decide to be happy.

Nightbirde subsequently received a Golden Buzzer from Simon Cowell for her performance of her original song "It's OK". The song became No. 1 on iTunes and No. 2 trending on YouTube.

In August 2021, before she could compete in the show's quarterfinal round, Nightbirde withdrew from the competition because of worsening health. Cowell encouraged her not to return to the competition, saying "You don't need the stress right now." She appeared via remote broadcast during the live quarterfinals of AGT to express gratitude, and gave an update about her health on August 11, 2021.

In an interview with Entertainment Tonight, Cowell said Nightbirde could have gone all the way and been crowned champion, if it had been possible. In July 2022, Cowell ranked his favorite Top 15 Golden Buzzer moments in AGT history during season 17, and Nightbirde placed first.

=== Posthumous releases ===
In March 2022, Nightbirde's song "It's OK" appeared during an episode of Good Trouble.

In April 2022, her 2021 song "Brave" was released posthumously as a single. The 2019 song "Fly" was officially released by her family on July 4, 2022. The single was later featured in the animated film trailer for The King of Kings (2025).

A 10-track debut album of Nightbirde's music dropped a year after her death (February 19, 2023), by her family and foundation. The title, It's OK, is based on her original song she performed during her AGT audition (season 16).

Another posthumous album, Still Got Dreams, was released three years after her death (February 20, 2025). The 12-track album features original songs and used ethical AI vocal production in honor of her musical vision. The title track features AGT alumni Mzansi Youth Choir (season 18). Additional singles "Get Up" and "Gold" are included on the album.

== Personal life ==
Following a move to Nashville in 2015, Marczewski took a break from performing. It was during this period that her stage name of Nightbirde originated, and when cancer was first diagnosed then later progressed. This was followed by her husband's request for a divorce. In 2020, she moved to Los Angeles to pursue clinical treatment, while staying with one of her brothers.

"It's OK" was one of the songs she wrote after this life-changing situation. She commented: "In that time, I never felt so lost, disconnected, and confused. This was the song that I myself needed to hear, so I wrote it for myself." However, the songs she wrote were not only for her, as she claimed: "I swore to myself that I would write the songs that people need to get through those times."

To raise money for her medical expenses, she sold merchandise on social media and utilized GoFundMe. Prior to her death, she wrote poetry and also painted.

== Health and death ==
Nightbirde was diagnosed with breast cancer in 2017, and declared cancer-free in July 2018. The cancer recurred in 2019, and she was given three to six months to live, but she was again declared cancer-free in 2020. Prior to her America's Got Talent audition, Nightbirde was told that the cancer had metastasized to her lungs, spine and liver. With only a 2% chance of survival, she gave health updates on CNN and social media. According to Nightbirde: "I have a two percent chance of survival, but two percent is not zero percent. Two percent is something, and I wish people knew how amazing it is."

At the age of 31, Nightbirde died from the disease on February 19, 2022. She was surrounded by family in her San Clemente, California residence. The AGT judges and host released condolences via social media. A celebration of life, which was livestreamed, was held at Cornerstone Church in Ohio on March 4, 2022.

== Legacy and honors ==
The Marczewski family created the Nightbirde Foundation, a 501c3 nonprofit that helps encourage and support women with breast cancer.

America's Got Talent: Extreme honored Nightbirde at the end of the "Auditions 2" episode on February 28, 2022. A title card with a photo of her read: "In Memory of Jane 'Nightbirde' Marczewski".

Inspired by Nightbirde, the Lebanese female dance troupe The Mayyas honored her during the audition episode of AGT season 17 on June 21, 2022. Nightbirde's song "It's OK" also played in the background during the beginning and ending of their performance. The Mayyas received the Golden Buzzer from Sofia Vergara and would go on to win the season.

An emotional tribute to Nightbirde was highlighted during an America's Got Talent special on July 5, 2022. Judge Simon Cowell and host Terry Crews featured their favorite Golden Buzzer winners, with Nightbirde being ranked the best moment (No. 1), on the retrospective episode.

In 2023, Nightbirde's music was additionally featured during the AGT season 18 auditions. The Mzansi Youth Choir (from Soweto, Johannesburg, South Africa) performed a cover version of her song "It's OK" and received a Golden Buzzer from the audience for the first time in the show's history, which was given by all four judges and Terry Crews.

In 2024, a drama therapy coach in war-torn Ukraine chose "It's OK" as the title of an original play for her teenage acting students, in which a recording of Nightbirde's rendition of the song was included. The experience of the young actors and their coach, to affirm things could be OK despite troubling challenges, was recounted in The New York Times article "For These Teenagers in Ukraine, Hope Arrived at the Stage Door."

In 2025, Nightbirde's music was featured again during the AGT season 20 "Greatest Golden Buzzers" (episode 8 aired July 22), with a clip of her original performance of "It's OK" and the Mzansi Youth Choir's cover of it.

== Discography ==
=== EPs ===
As Jane Marczewski:

- Lines (2012)
- Ocean & Sky (2013)

=== Singles ===
As Nightbirde:

List of singles, with selected chart positions
Title	Year	Peak chart position				Album
Title	Year	US Dig.	AUS Dig.	CAN Dig.	UK Down.	Album
"Girl in a Bubble"	2019	—	—	—	—	Non-album singles
"Fly"	2019	—	—	—	—	Non-album singles
"It's OK"	2020	—	—	—	—	Non-album singles
"New Year's Eve"	2020	—	—	—	—	Non-album singles
"It's OK" (Live at Maple House Sessions)	2021	3	1	1	21	Non-album singles
"Brave" (Live at Maple House Sessions)	2021	—	—	—	—	Non-album singles
"New Year's Eve (Yacht Money Remix)"	2021	—	—	—	—	Non-album singles
"—" denotes a recording that did not chart or was not released in that territory.

Note: "Fly" and "Brave" were officially released as singles posthumously in 2022.

=== Albums ===
- It's OK (2023)
- Still Got Dreams (2025)

Note: Both albums were released posthumously by Nightbirde's family.

== See also ==
- America's Got Talent (season 16)
