= America's Got Talent season 18 =

America's Got Talent
- Season 18
- Promotional poster for season 18, featuring (L to R) judges Mandel, Vergara, Cowell, and Klum alongside host Crews
- Showrunners: Jason Raff; Sam Donnelly
- Hosted by: Terry Crews
- Judges: Howie Mandel; Heidi Klum; Sofía Vergara; Simon Cowell
- Winner: Adrian Stoica and Hurricane
- Runner-up: Anna DeGuzman
- Finals venue: Pasadena Civic Auditorium
- No. of episodes: 24

Release
- Original network: NBC
- Original release: May 30 – September 27, 2023

Season chronology
- ← Previous; Season 17 Next → Season 19

Judges and Host for America's Got Talent Season 18

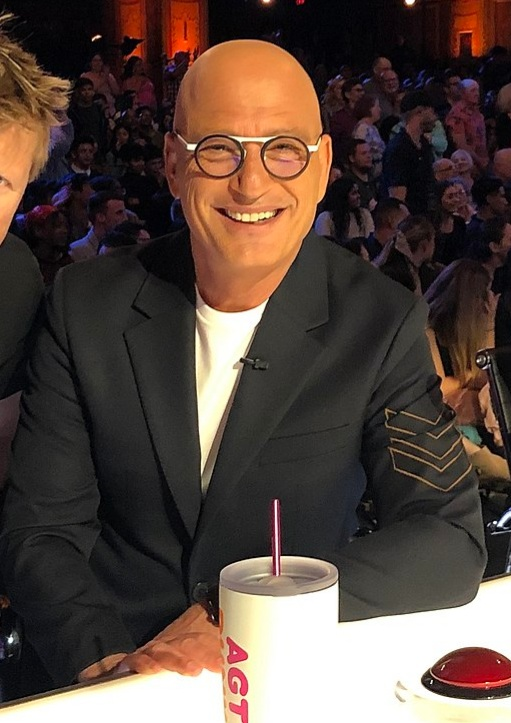
Howie Mandel

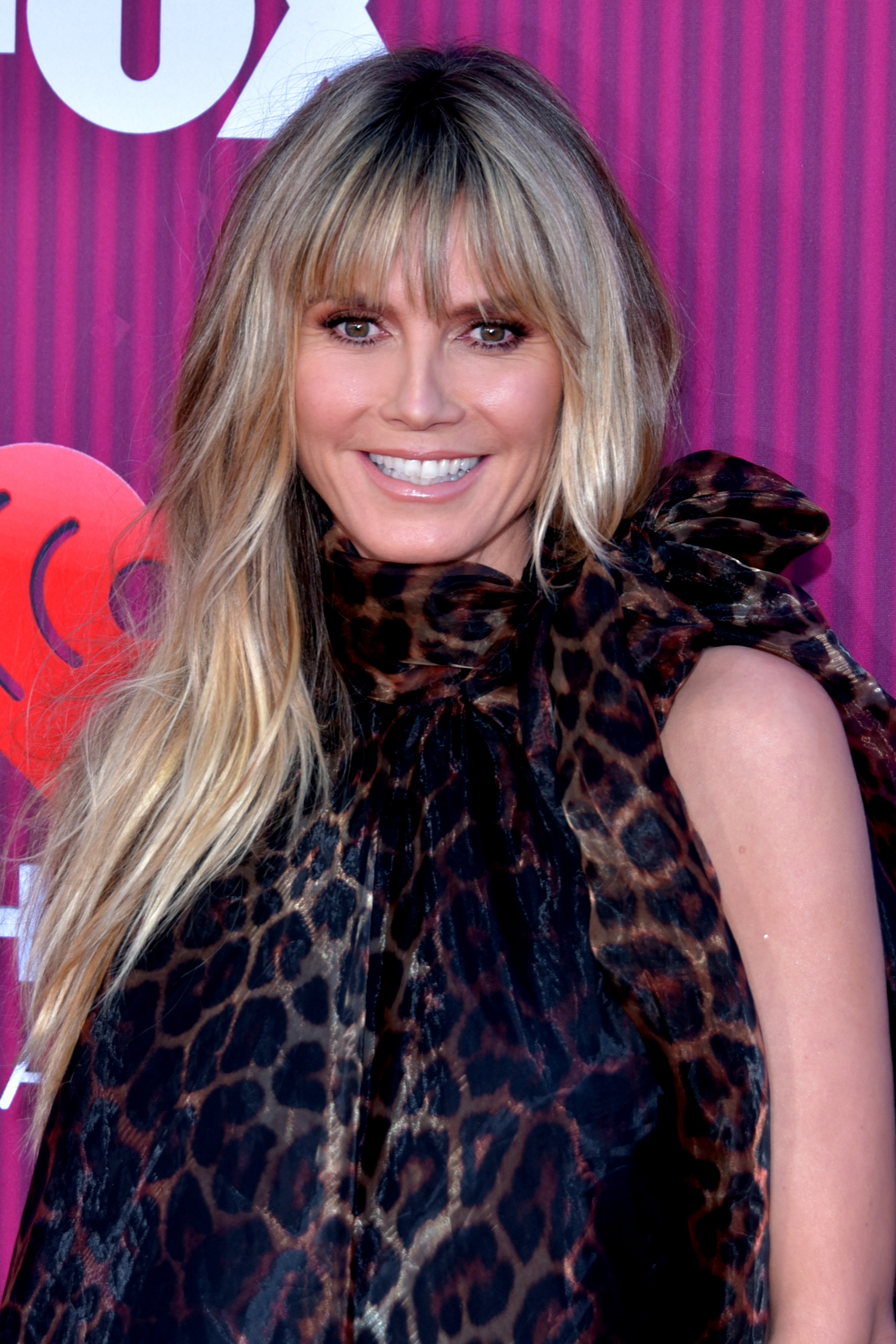
Heidi Klum

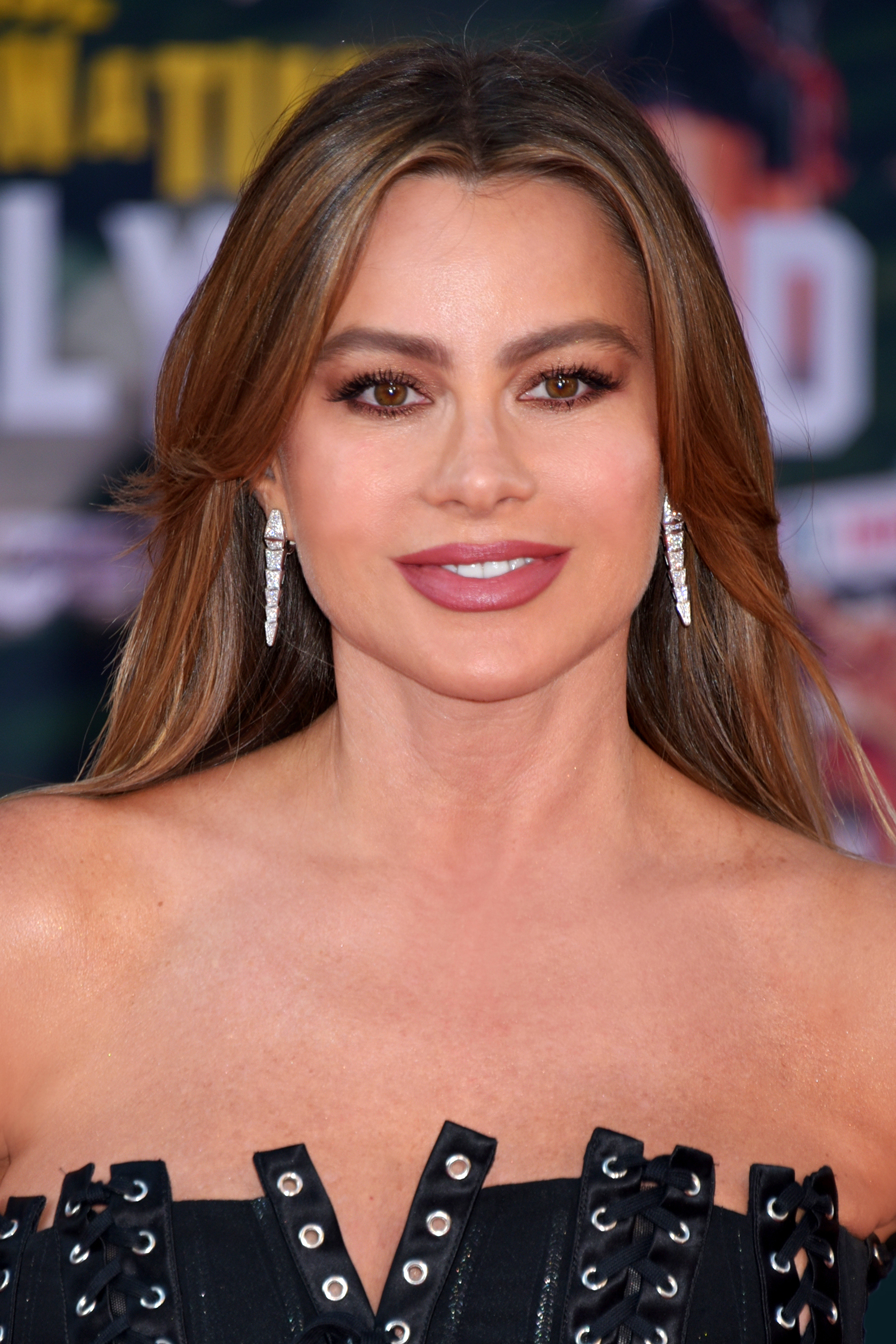
Sofía Vergara

Simon Cowell

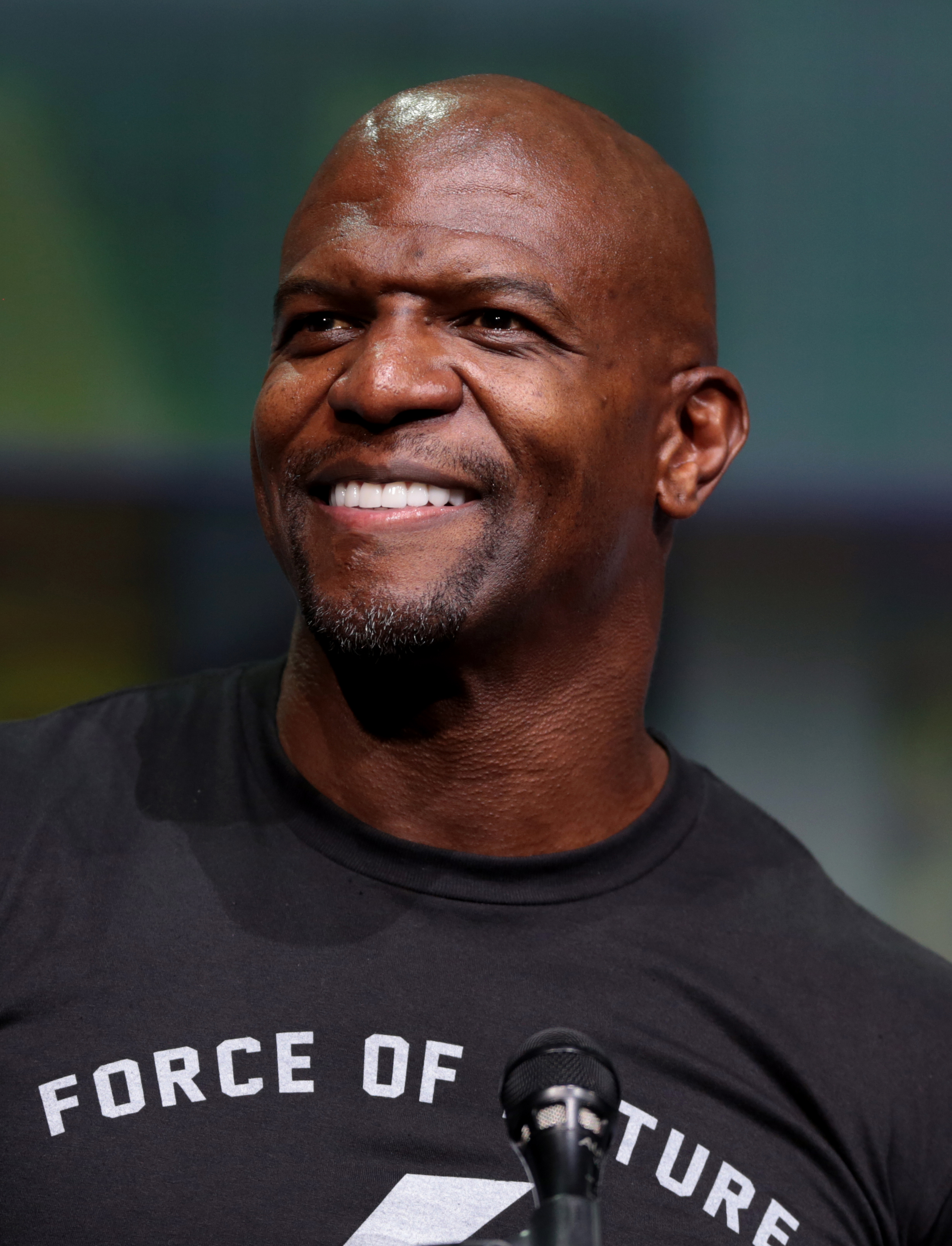
Terry Crews

The eighteenth season of the American talent show competition series America's Got Talent premiered on NBC on May 30, 2023. It concluded on September 27, 2023.

The season was won by dog act Adrian Stoica and Hurricane, with magician Anna DeGuzman finishing second, and dance group Murmuration placing third. During its broadcast, the season averaged around 5.47 million viewers.

== Production ==
On March 3, 2023, it was announced that the entire main cast from the previous season would return for the new season. On March 30, 2023, it was announced that the season would premiere on May 30, 2023.

== Season overview ==
For the first time in the show's history, the audience used the Golden Buzzer for Mzansi Youth Choir. This occurrence follows the sixteenth season of Britain's Got Talent to use this addition.

Just like the previous season, during the final qualifying round results show on September 20, an Instant Save vote was held for viewers to send a final wildcard into the finals. The four acts included in this vote were acts that were eliminated in the live shows, with each act selected by one of the judges; Mandel selected Avantgardey, Klum selected Herwan Legaillard, Vergara selected Gabriel Henrique, and Cowell selected Chioma & the Atlanta Drum Academy. Avantgardey ultimately won the public vote, taking the last spot in the season's finals.

Winner | Runner-up | Third place | Finalist | Qualifier
America's Instant Save | Golden Buzzer Audition

Participant	Age(s)	Genre	Act	From	Qualifier	Result
82nd Airborne Chorus	20-33	Singing	Choir	Fort Bragg, North Carolina	5	Finalist
Adrian Stoica and Hurricane	45 & 9	Animals	Dog Act	Turin, Italy	1	Winner
Ahren Belisle	28	Comedy	Comedian	North Bay, Ontario, Canada	2	Finalist
Alfie Andrew	12	Singing	Singer	Manchester, England	2	Eliminated
Andrew Stanton	42	Danger	Sword Swallower	Las Vegas	2	Eliminated
Anna DeGuzman	24	Magic	Magician	Bergenfield, New Jersey	4	Runner-up
Avantgardey	18-27	Dance	Dance Group	Osaka, Japan	5	Finalist
Barry Brewer Jr.	40	Comedy	Comedian & Pianist	Chicago	3	Eliminated
Brynn Cummings	12	Comedy / Magic	Ventriloquist & Magician	Paw Paw, Michigan	1	Eliminated
Chibi Unity	16-25	Dance	Dance Group	Niigata, Japan	4	Finalist
Chioma & the Atlanta Drum Academy	6-14	Music	Percussion Group	Atlanta	2	Eliminated
D'Corey Johnson	12	Singing	Singer	Louisville, Kentucky	4	Eliminated
Dani Kerr	24	Singing / Music	Singer & Guitarist	Statesville, North Carolina	2	Eliminated
Eduardo Antonio Trevino	11	Singing	Mariachi Singer	Humble, Texas	5	Eliminated
Erica Coffelt	36	Dance	Dancer	Reno, Nevada	2	Eliminated
Eseniia Mikheeva	7	Dance	Dancer	Moscow	5	Eliminated
Freedom Singers	22-65	Singing	Vocal Group	Los Angeles	4	Eliminated
Gabriel Henrique	27	Singing	Singer	Minas Gerais, Brazil	5	Eliminated
Grace Good	30	Acrobatics	Aerialist & Hula Hooper	Las Vegas	5	Eliminated
Herwan Legaillard	33	Acrobatics / Danger	Aerialist & Sword Swallower	Paris	3	Eliminated
John Wines	59	Music	Electric Guitarist	Dorset, England	1	Eliminated
Justin Jackson	33	Dance	Tap Dancer	Montréal, Québec, Canada	3	Eliminated
Kylie Frey	28	Singing / Music	Singer & Guitarist	Opelousas, Louisiana	4	Eliminated
Lachuné	31	Singing	Singer	Fort Worth, Texas	5	Eliminated
Lambros Garcia	10	Dance	Dancer	Glen Head, New York	1	Eliminated
Lavender Darcangelo	27	Singing	Singer	Fitchburg, Massachusetts	1	Finalist
Mandy Muden	61	Comedy / Magic	Comic Magician	London	5	Eliminated
Mariandrea	14	Acrobatics / Dance	Dancer & Contortionist	Mexico	4	Eliminated
Maureen Langan	62	Comedy	Comedian	Manhattan, New York	1	Eliminated
Mitch Rossell	35	Singing / Music	Singer & Guitarist	Chattanooga, Tennessee	1	Eliminated
MOS	20-27	Music	Brass Band	Japan	3	Eliminated
Murmuration	12-25	Dance	Dance Group	Nîmes, France	2	Third place
Mzansi Youth Choir	19-23	Singing	Choir	Soweto, Johannesburg, South Africa	3	Finalist
Oleksandr Leshchenko & Magic Innovations	34	Dance	Multimedia Dancer	Kyiv, Ukraine	1	Eliminated
Orlando Leyba	45	Comedy	Comedian	Miami	4	Eliminated
Phil Wright & Parent Jam	36	Dance	Dance Group	Los Angeles	3	Eliminated
Philip Bowen	38	Music	Violinist	Detroit	3	Eliminated
Puppet Simon & the Cowbelles	—N/a	Comedy / Singing	Puppet Act	Farmersville, California	4	Eliminated
Putri Ariani	17	Singing / Music	Singer & Pianist	Yogyakarta, Indonesia	3	Grand-finalist
Ramadhani Brothers	26 & 36	Acrobatics	Acrobatic Duo	Dar es Salaam, Tanzania	5	Grand-finalist
Ray Wold & Mom	64 & 85	Danger	Danger Act	Las Vegas	1	Eliminated
Roland Abante	45	Singing	Singer	Santander, Philippines	4	Eliminated
Ryland Petty	10	Magic	Magician	Cannock, United Kingdom	2	Eliminated
SAINTED Trap Choir	21-44	Singing	Choir	Charlotte, North Carolina	1	Eliminated
SangSoon Kim	28	Magic	Magician	Seoul, South Korea	5	Eliminated
Shadow Ace	26	Variety	Shadow Artist	Calatagan, Batangas, Philippines	4	Eliminated
Sharpe Family Singers	14-57	Singing	Vocal Group	Basking Ridge, New Jersey	2	Eliminated
Steel Panther	51-57	Singing / Music	Band	Hollywood, Los Angeles, California	2	Eliminated
Summer Rios	19	Singing	Singer	Brunswick, Ohio	3	Eliminated
Three G	19-24	Acrobatics	Acrobatic Trio	Lutsk, Ukraine	2	Eliminated
Trailer Flowers	27 & 28	Singing / Music	Singing & Guitarist Duo	Wildwood, Missouri	5	Eliminated
Trigg Watson	33	Magic	Magician	Los Angeles	3	Eliminated
True Villains	28-36	Singing / Music	Band	Nashville	1	Eliminated
Warrior Squad	14-30	Acrobatics	Acrobatic Group	Gurgaon, India	3	Eliminated
Zion Clark	25	Acrobatics	Acrobat	Drexel Hill, Pennsylvania	4	Eliminated

=== Qualifiers summary ===
Buzzed Out | Advanced to Finals | Eliminated (Top 3) | Eliminated (Top 5)

==== Qualifier 1 (August 22) ====
Guest Performer, Results Show: Craig Robinson, Aidan Bryant, The Pack Drumline, Human Fountains, Light Balance, Kodi Lee

Participant	Order	Buzzes				Result (August 23)
Participant	Order	Cowell	Vergara	Klum	Mandel	Result (August 23)
True Villains	1					Eliminated
Lambros Garcia	2					Eliminated
Mitch Rossell	3					Eliminated (Top 3)
Oleksandr Leshchenko & Magic Innovations	4					Eliminated (Top 5)
Adrian Stoica and Hurricane	5					Advanced
SAINTED Trap Choir	6					Eliminated
Brynn Cummings	7					Eliminated (Top 5)
John Wines	8					Eliminated
Maureen Langan	9					Eliminated
Ray Wold & Mom	10					Eliminated
Lavender Darcangelo	11					Advanced

==== Qualifier 2 (August 29) ====
Guest Performer, Results Show: Shin Lim

Participant	Order	Buzzes				Result (August 30)
Participant	Order	Cowell	Vergara	Klum	Mandel	Result (August 30)
Chioma & the Atlanta Drum Academy	1					Eliminated (Top 3)
Sharpe Family Singers	2					Eliminated
Three G	3					Eliminated
Erica Coffelt	4					Eliminated
Alfie Andrew	5					Eliminated (Top 5)
Ahren Belisle	6					Advanced
Dani Kerr	7					Eliminated
Ryland Petty	8					Eliminated (Top 5)
Andrew Stanton	9					Eliminated
Steel Panther	10					Eliminated
Murmuration	11					Advanced

==== Qualifier 3 (September 5) ====
Guest Performer, Results Show: Detroit Lions Cheerleaders, Chapel Hart

Participant	Order	Buzzes				Result (September 6)
Participant	Order	Cowell	Vergara	Klum	Mandel	Result (September 6)
Warrior Squad	1					Eliminated (Top 3)
Trigg Watson	2					Eliminated
Summer Rios	3					Eliminated
Phil Wright & Parent Jam	4					Eliminated
Philip Bowen	5					Eliminated (Top 5)
Mzansi Youth Choir	6					Advanced
Justin Jackson	7					Eliminated
MOS	8					Eliminated (Top 5)
Barry Brewer Jr.	9					Eliminated
Herwan Legaillard	10					Eliminated
Putri Ariani	11					Advanced

==== Qualifier 4 (September 12) ====
Guest Performer, Results Show: Drake Milligan

Participant	Order	Buzzes				Result (September 13)
Participant	Order	Cowell	Vergara	Klum	Mandel	Result (September 13)
Zion Clark	1					Eliminated (Top 5)
Puppet Simon & the Cow Belles	2					Eliminated
Roland Abante	3					Eliminated
Mariandrea	4					Eliminated
Kylie Frey	5					Eliminated
Chibi Unity	6					Advanced
Freedom Singers	7					Eliminated
Orlando Leyba	8					Eliminated
Anna DeGuzman	9					Advanced
D'Corey Johnson	10					Eliminated (Top 5)
Shadow Ace	11					Eliminated (Top 3)

==== Qualifier 5 (September 19) ====
Guest Performer, Results Show: Reba McEntire, Sofie Dossi

Participant	Order	Buzzes				Result (September 20)
Participant	Order	Cowell	Vergara	Klum	Mandel	Result (September 20)
Eduardo Antonio Trevino	1					Eliminated (Top 5)
Grace Good	2					Eliminated
Lachuné	3					Eliminated
Eseniia Mikheeva	4					Eliminated
Mandy Muden	5					Eliminated
Avantgardey ^{2}	6					Eliminated (Top 5)
Trailer Flowers	7			^{1}		Eliminated
Ramadhani Brothers	8					Advanced
Gabriel Henrique	9					Eliminated (Top 3)
Sangsoon Kim	10					Eliminated
82nd Airborne Chorus	11					Advanced

- ^1 Mandel pressed Klum's buzzer during Trailer Flowers' performance instead of his own. Mandel proceeded to claim he would never press his buzzer during the semi-finals, despite video shown afterwards showing him pressing Klum's buzzer.
- ^2 Avantgardey was brought back as a Wildcard act for the Finals.

=== Finals (September 26–27) ===
Guest Performers, Results Show: Mayyas

Winner | Runner-up | 3rd place | Top 5

Finalist	Performed with (2nd Performance)	Result (September 27)
82nd Airborne Chorus	N/A	Finalist
Adrian Stoica and Hurricane	Cat Cora	1st
Ahren Belisle	N/A	Finalist
Anna DeGuzman	Jason Derulo^{1}	2nd
Avantgardey	N/A	Finalist
Chibi Unity	Thirty Seconds to Mars^{2}	Finalist
Lavender Darcangelo	Diane Warren	Finalist
Murmuration	Jason Derulo^{1}	3rd
Mzansi Youth Choir	Jon Batiste	Finalist
Putri Ariani	Leona Lewis	Grand-finalist
Ramadhani Brothers	Thirty Seconds to Mars^{2}	Grand-finalist

- ^1 Anna DeGuzman and Murmuration conducted a joint routine for their second performance, and thus shared the same guest performer.
- ^2 Chibi Unity and Ramadhani Brothers conducted a joint routine for their second performance, and thus shared the same guest performer.

== Ratings ==
Viewership and ratings per episode of America's Got Talent season 18
No.	Title	Air date	Timeslot (ET)	Rating (18–49)	Viewers (millions)	Ref.
1	"Auditions 1"	May 30, 2023	Tuesday 8:00 p.m.	0.7	6.11	
2	"Auditions 2"	June 6, 2023	Tuesday 8:00 p.m.	0.7	6.14	
3	"Auditions 3"	June 13, 2023	Tuesday 8:00 p.m.	0.6	5.96	
4	"Auditions 4"	June 20, 2023	Tuesday 8:00 p.m.	0.7	5.99	
5	"Auditions 5"	June 27, 2023	Tuesday 8:00 p.m.	0.7	5.90	
6	"Auditions 6"	July 11, 2023	Tuesday 8:00 p.m.	0.6	5.61	
7	"Auditions 7"	July 18, 2023	Tuesday 8:00 p.m.	0.6	5.63	
8	"Simon's Most Memorable Auditions"	July 25, 2023	Tuesday 8:00 p.m.	0.4	4.83	
9	"Auditions 8"	August 1, 2023	Tuesday 8:00 p.m.	0.6	5.65	
10	"Auditions 9"	August 8, 2023	Tuesday 8:00 p.m.	0.6	5.68	
11	"Road to Lives"	August 15, 2023	Tuesday 8:00 p.m.	0.5	4.40	
12	"Qualifiers 1"	August 22, 2023	Tuesday 8:00 p.m.	0.6	5.82	
13	"Qualifiers 1 Results"	August 23, 2023	Wednesday 8:00 p.m.	0.5	4.88	
14	"Qualifiers 2"	August 29, 2023	Tuesday 8:00 p.m.	0.6	5.51	
15	"Qualifiers 2 Results"	August 30, 2023	Wednesday 8:00 p.m.	0.5	5.00	
16	"Qualifiers 3"	September 5, 2023	Tuesday 8:00 p.m.	0.5	5.56	
17	"Qualifiers 3 Results"	September 6, 2023	Wednesday 8:00 p.m.	0.5	5.22	
18	"Qualifiers 4"	September 12, 2023	Tuesday 8:00 p.m.	0.6	5.70	
19	"Qualifiers 4 Results"	September 13, 2023	Wednesday 8:00 p.m.	0.4	5.08	
20	"Qualifiers 5"	September 19, 2023	Tuesday 8:00 p.m.	0.6	5.48	
21	"Qualifiers 5 Results"	September 20, 2023	Wednesday 8:00 p.m.	0.5	5.33	
22	"Finale Performances"	September 26, 2023	Tuesday 9:00 p.m.	0.6	5.54	
23	"Countdown to the Finale"	September 27, 2023	Wednesday 8:00 p.m.	0.4	4.08	
24	"Finale Results"	September 27, 2023	Wednesday 9:00 p.m.	0.5	5.36	
