= Don McMillan =

American comedian

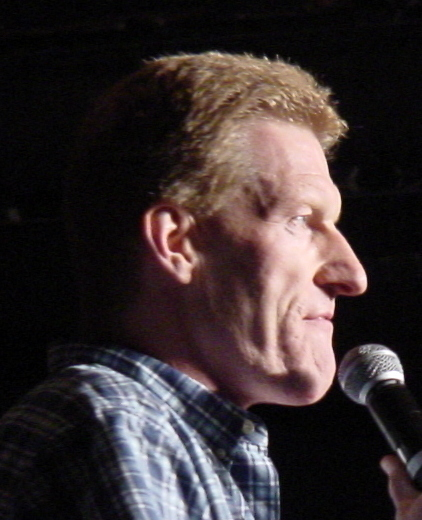
- McMillan at QuakeCon 2003
- Born: July 15, 1958 (age 68)
- Website: DonMcMillan.com

Don McMillan is an American comedian and former engineer based in the San Francisco Bay Area.

== Education ==
McMillan earned a Bachelor of Science in electrical engineering from Lehigh University and a Master of Science in electrical engineering from Stanford University.

== Career ==
McMillan worked at AT&T Bell Laboratories, where he was a part of the team that designed the world's first 32-bit microprocessor, the Bellmac 32. He then moved to the Silicon Valley, where he worked at VLSI Technology as a computer chip designer. During his six years at VLSI, he designed more than 50 standard and ASIC designs, many of which are still in use.

His comedy is stand-up based on technical comedy and corporate comedy. One of his popular shows is Life After Death by PowerPoint which has been popular on YouTube and for live events.

He has also acted in and/or written episodes on Star Trek: Voyager, Babylon 5 and multiple other movies. He has also starred as a guest on talk shows.

In 2022, McMillan competed on the television show America's Got Talent, where he advanced to the live shows as one of the top 55 qualifiers. He was third in his group of eleven qualifiers and was eliminated, as only the top two of the group advanced to the finale.

== Filmography ==
=== Film ===
Year	Title	Role	Notes
1997	The Fanatics	Jerry	
1997	Macon County Jail	Clerk	
1998	The Party Crashers	Bouncer	
2000	Air Bud: World Pup	Webster	
2002	Life Without Dick	Michael	
2003	Don: Plain & Tall	Don	Also writer and producer
2009	Homewrecker	Bar Patron	

=== Television ===
Year	Title	Role	Notes
1991	Up All Night	—N/a	Episode: "The Evil Dead/The Unholy"
1991–1994	An Evening at the Improv	—N/a	3 episodes
1996	Step by Step	Joe	Episode: "What's Wrong with This Picture?"
1998	Babylon 5	Bartender	Episode: "The Corps Is Mother, the Corps Is Father"
2000	City Guys	Exterminator	Episode: "Harlem Honey"
2000	Star Trek: Voyager	Hirogen #3	Episode: "Flesh and Blood"
2022	America's Got Talent	Himself, performer	

== Videos ==
- Mathematical pi sequence
- AGT first appearance Season 17, episode 9
- AGT second appearance with slideshow presentation
- AGT third appearance with Roast of Simon Cowell presented in statistical graphs and charts
