= Air Bud: World Pup =

2000 comedy film by Bill Bannerman

- DVD cover art
- Directed by: Bill Bannerman
- Written by: Mike Whiting; Robert Vince; Anne Vince
- Based on: Characters by Paul Tamasy; Aaron Mendelsohn; Kevin DiCicco
- Produced by: Ian Fodie
- Starring: Kevin Zegers; Caitlin Wachs; Brittany Paige Bouck; Martin Ferrero; Miguel Sandoval; Duncan Regehr; Don McMillan; Dale Midkiff
- Cinematography: Cyrus Block
- Edited by: Kelly Herron; Laura Mazur
- Music by: Brahm Wenger
- Production company: Keystone Entertainment (Note: As World Pup Productions Inc.)
- Distributed by: Warner Home Video (Canada); Buena Vista Home Entertainment (Note: Under Walt Disney Home Video imprint. Presented by Dimension Films.) (United States and most territories)
- Release date: December 12, 2000
- Running time: 83 minutes
- Countries: Canada; United States
- Language: English

Air Bud: World Pup, also known as Air Bud 3, is a 2000 sports comedy film directed by Bill Bannerman. The third film in the Air Bud series, it was the second to be filmed without the original Buddy, the canine star of the first film from 1997; Buddy died after production of the first film. Air Bud: World Pup was the first film in the Air Bud series not to be released theatrically in the United States, opting to only be released on video, but was played in Philippine theaters for a limited time. Air Bud: World Pup was released on December 12, 2000 by Warner Home Video in Canada and by Buena Vista Home Entertainment in the United States.

== Plot ==
A few years after winning the football tournament and accepting him to be his 'new' stepfather, teenager Josh Framm's mother, Jackie Framm, has just married her veterinarian boyfriend, Dr. Patrick Sullivan. Josh and his best friend, Tom Stewart, had made their high school's soccer team, which their coach reveals will be co-ed. Josh meets Emma Putter, an attractive, blonde, wealthy girl who just moved to Fernfield from England after her mother died and will not only be playing on his soccer team but also has a Golden Retriever named Molly, whom Josh's Golden Retriever, Buddy, finds attractive.

One day during practice, Josh discovers that Buddy has the uncanny ability to play soccer and is given a try at making a goal, which he succeeds at. With that, Buddy is recruited to join the Timberwolves team for the third time. Emma invites Josh to a party at her house, and Tom arrives dressed up like a British soldier. At the same time, things start to work out between Buddy and Molly, and they become infatuated on the second floor in Emma's house. Josh's sister, Andrea Framm, and her best friend, Tammy Slayton, want to scope out what is happening at the party.

One day, the soccer committee decides, based on Jack Stearns, the chair’s recommendation, to ban the Timberwolves from the soccer league because they have Buddy on their team. The Timberwolves are given two options: remove Buddy from their team or their team from the league. A few days later, Molly gives birth to six puppies, making Buddy a 'father'. Knowing Buddy is the star player, they quit the league. When Jack's son, Spartans all-star captain Steve Stearns, learns that the Timberwolves have been banned, he confronts his father, leading to Jack calling the Timberwolves coach Montoya and informing him that the committee had a change of heart. The Timberwolves are allowed back in the league. Buddy has a uniform and is officially on the team, leading Josh and Emma's soccer team to the state championship against the Spartans.

Still, trouble ensues when Buddy and Molly's puppies are kidnapped by Snerbert, who wants to sell them. Once they are caught by Josh, Andrea, Emma, and Snerbert's sidekick, Webster, the butler whom Emma's father, Geoffrey Putter, hired to help care for Molly during her pregnancy throws Snerbert under the bus by revealing the motive for the kidnapping: Snerbert wanted to get rich, while Webster just wanted a puppy. Webster has a change of heart and joins them by helping drive Andrea, Josh, Emma, Buddy, Molly, and the puppies to the stadium for the game, which the Timberwolves are losing because Emma, Josh, and Buddy did not show up for the first half. The Timberwolves win the championship thanks to Buddy's game-winning goal.

A few months later, Buddy helps the United States women's national soccer team win the FIFA Women's World Cup in a penalty shootout against Norway.

== Cast ==
- Kevin Zegers as Josh Framm, Buddy's owner
- Caitlin Wachs as Andrea Framm, Josh's younger sister
- Brittany Paige Bouck as Emma Putter, the new girl in Fernfield having moved from England and Molly's owner
- Martin Ferrero as Snerbert, the dog catcher
- Miguel Sandoval as Coach Montoya, the coach of Josh, Emma, Tom and Buddy's team The Timberwolves
- Duncan Regehr as Geoffrey Putter, Emma's father
- Don McMillan as Will Webster III, the Putter's butler and a former sidekick dog catcher with Snerbert
- Dale Midkiff as Dr. Patrick Sullivan, Josh and Andrea's new stepfather and Jackie's new second husband
- Brandi Chastain as herself, the number 6 from FIFA Women's World Cup
- Briana Scurry as herself, the number 1 of Goalie from FIFA Women's World Cup
- Tisha Venturini as herself, the number 15 from FIFA Women's World Cup
- Chilton Crane as Jackie Framm-Sullivan, Josh and Andrea's mother and wife to Patrick Sullivan
- Shayn Solberg as Tom Stewart, Josh's best friend at Fernfield High School
- Chantal Strand as Tammy Slayton, Andrea's best friend
- Patricia Idlette as Mrs. Brimstone, the Putter's housekeeper
- Fred Keating as Jack Stearns, the coach of the Timberwolves rival team "The Spartans"
- Jeremy Guilbaut as Steve Stearns, Jack's son and the star player of the Spartans
- Levi James as Sam Drake, a member of the Timberwolves
- Shane Vajda as Moose, a member of the Timberwolves
- United States women's national soccer team players as themselves
- Alexander Ludwig as himself

== Production ==
After falling out with Keystone Entertainment and producer Robert Vince, Buddy's owner, Kevin DiCicco, attempted to make his own sequel titled Air Bud: The Next Generation in 1999. This project never materialized.

Shooting took place in Vancouver. The soccer field and red brick buildings in the background are part of Shaughnessy Elementary School.

== Release ==
=== Canada ===
Air Bud: World Pup was released direct-to-video through Warner Home Video on VHS in 2000. It was later released on DVD by Phase 4 Films.

=== United States ===
The film was released directly to DVD and VHS on December 12, 2000 by Buena Vista Home Entertainment. Walt Disney Studios Home Entertainment continued its line of Air Bud Special Edition DVDs with the release of Air Bud: World Pup Special Edition on June 16, 2010.

Mill Creek Entertainment reissued the film on January 14, 2020 on a 2-disc boxset also containing other Air Bud films owned by Air Bud Entertainment.

All five Air Bud films, including World Pup, arrived on Disney+ on October 1, 2023.

== Reception ==
Michael Scheinfeld from Common Sense Media gave the film four stars out of five, saying the film "has a big heart and positive values involving sharing, cooperation, and friendship, but it never gets preachy or sappy".

== See also ==
- List of association football films
