= America's Got Talent season 17 =

America's Got Talent
- Season 17
- Promotional poster for season 17, featuring (L to R) host Crews alongside judges Vergara, Cowell, Klum, and Mandel
- Showrunners: Jason Raff; Sam Donnelly
- Hosted by: Terry Crews
- Judges: Howie Mandel; Heidi Klum; Sofía Vergara; Simon Cowell
- Winner: Mayyas
- Runner-up: Kristy Sellars
- Finals venue: Pasadena Civic Auditorium
- No. of episodes: 22

Release
- Original network: NBC
- Original release: May 31 – September 14, 2022

Season chronology
- ← Previous; Season 16 Next → Season 18

Judges and Host for America's Got Talent Season 17

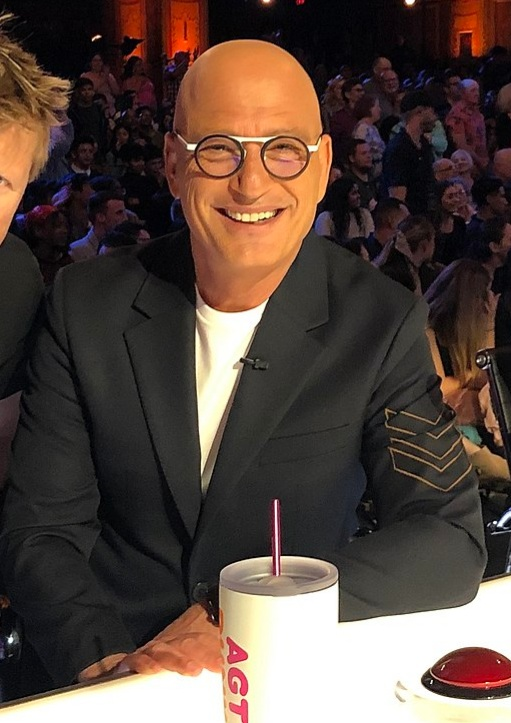
Howie Mandel

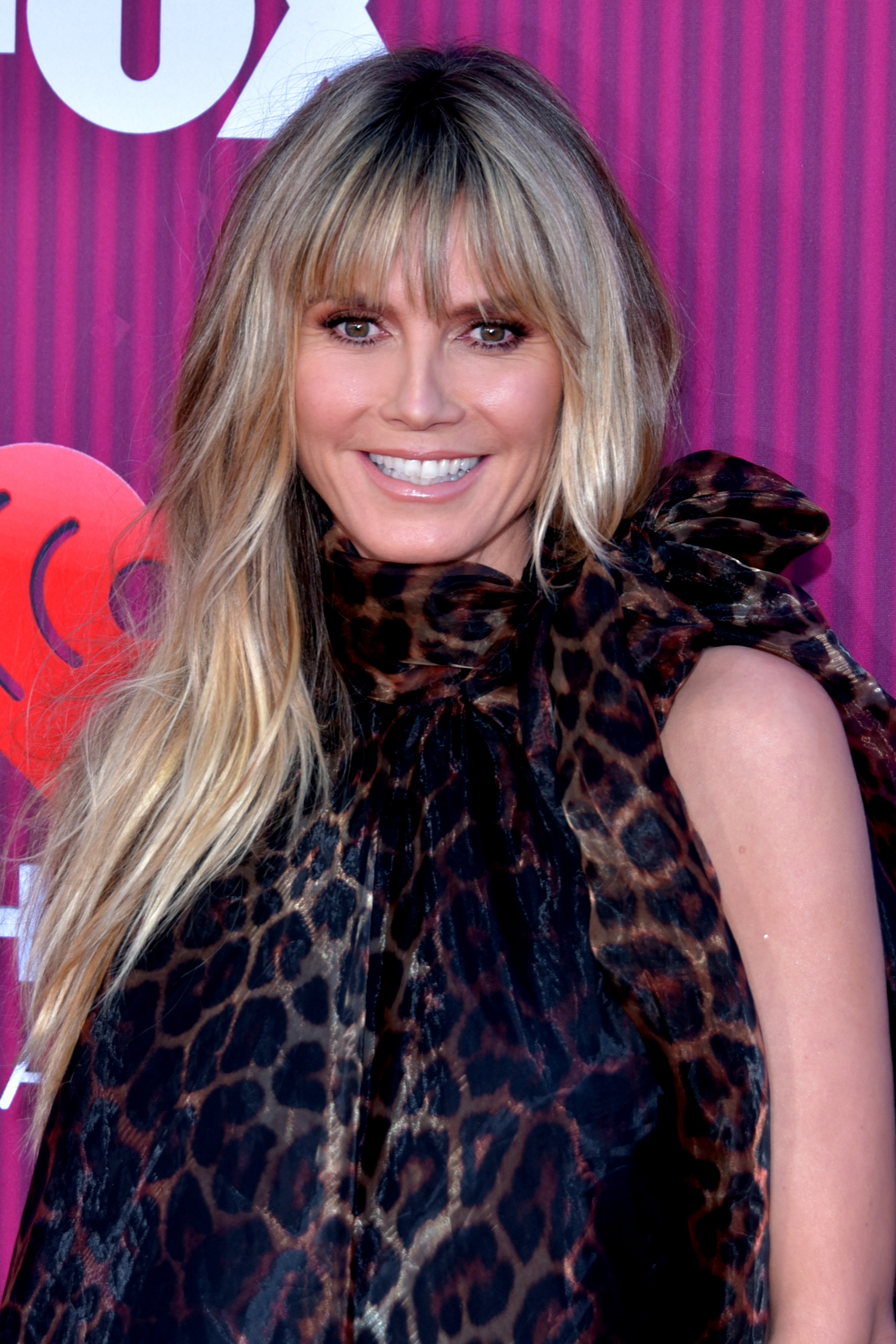
Heidi Klum

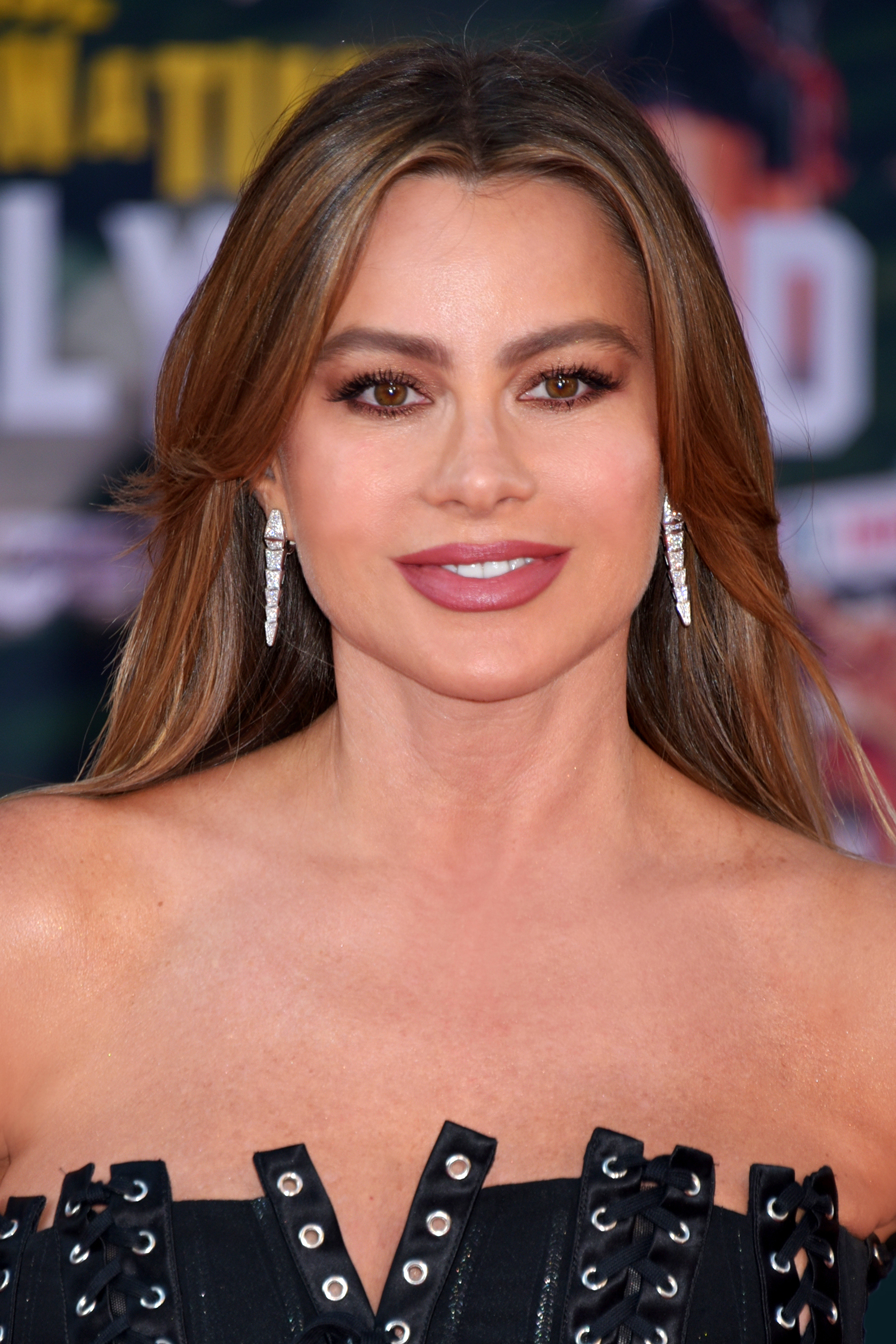
Sofía Vergara

Simon Cowell

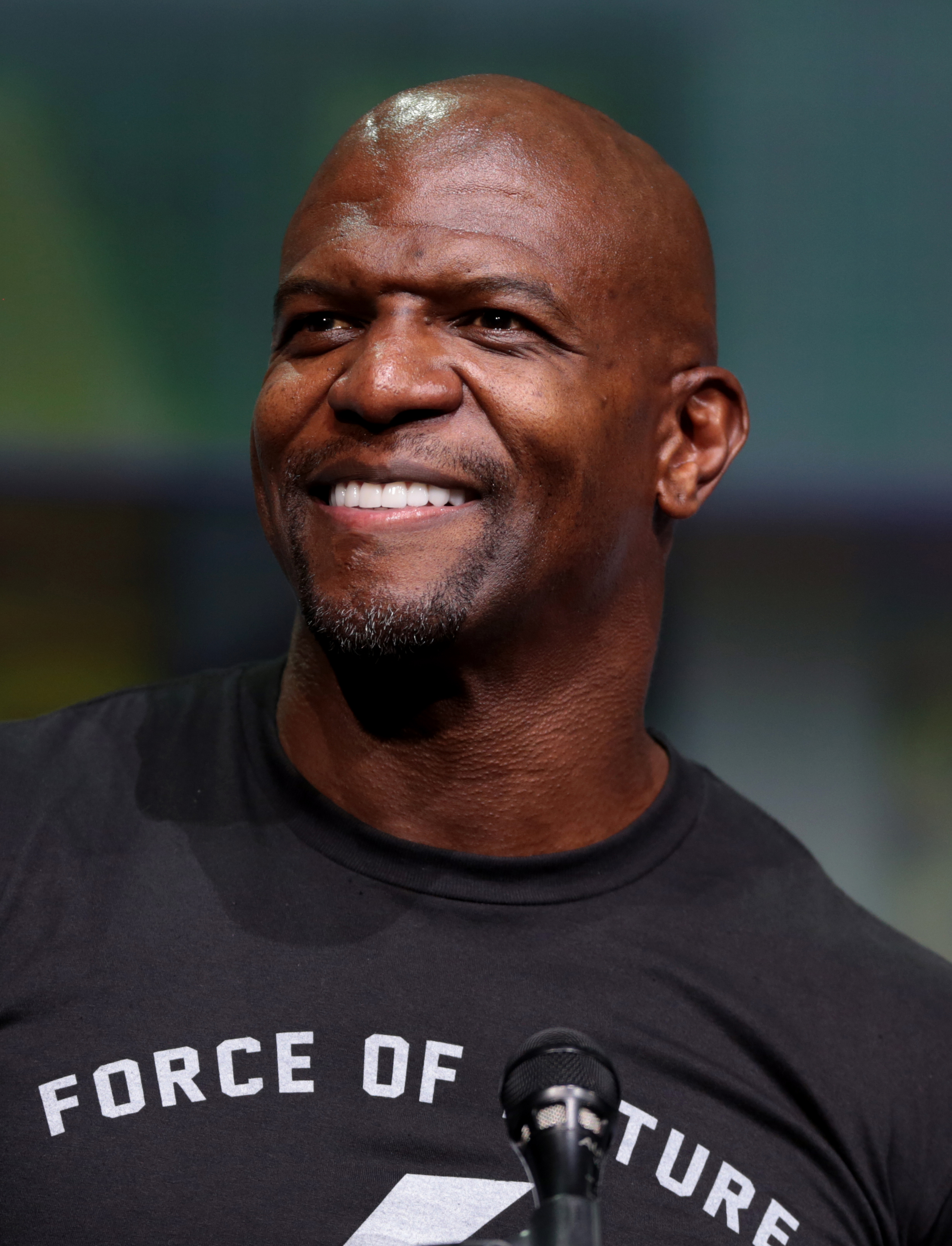
Terry Crews

The seventeenth season of the American talent show competition series America's Got Talent premiered on NBC on May 31, 2022, and concluded on September 14, 2022. This season featured the return of a full audience without COVID-19 restrictions, which had begun during the fifteenth season.

The season was won by dance group Mayyas, with pole dancer Kristy Sellars finishing second, and singer and guitarist Drake Milligan placing third. During its broadcast, the season averaged around 6.14 million viewers.

== Production ==
On March 31, 2022, it was announced that the entire main cast from the previous season would return for the new season and that the season would premiere on May 31. Originally, host Terry Crews announced the 'end of an era' in September 2021, stating that the season sixteen finale of America's Got Talent and the series finale of Brooklyn Nine-Nine had marked the end of his deal with NBC.

Judge Howie Mandel was partially absent from the June 14, July 19, and August 2 episodes, and was entirely absent in the July 12 episode, due to contracting COVID-19 at the 2022 Kids' Choice Awards. Additionally, judge Sofía Vergara was absent from the judge deliberations at Simon Cowell's house.

The live shows for the season were held at the Pasadena Civic Auditorium, the same venue where auditions have been filmed since season eleven. The live shows had been held at the Dolby Theatre since the same season, excluding season fifteen, during which the live shows were held at Universal Studios Hollywood.

== Season overview ==
Judge Simon Cowell and host Terry Crews named their favorite Golden Buzzer recipients from the previous seasons in a special retrospective episode on July 5. Singer Nightbirde from season sixteen was ranked as the number one Golden Buzzer in AGT history. Inspired by Nightbirde, who died from cancer in February 2022, Lebanese dance group Mayyas previously honored her during an audition episode on June 21. They received a Golden Buzzer from judge Sofía Vergara.

For the second time in AGT history (the first in season sixteen), a group Golden Buzzer was given by all the judges and host on the July 19 episode, to country trio Chapel Hart for their original song "You Can Have Him Jolene".

Unlike previous seasons of AGT, the live show format was changed to accommodate the top 55 acts, which were divided into five qualifying rounds of eleven acts (two acts from each qualifying round plus a wildcard advanced to the finals), instead of the usual quarter-final and semi-final rounds. In the judge deliberations portion of the episode aired on August 2, the judges selected 54 of the top 55 spots. Following this episode, a public vote was opened to allow viewers to vote the last act into the live shows. Danger act Auzzy Blood, singers Ben Waites and Debbii Dawson, and comedian Jordan Conley were all in contention for the final spot in the top 55. During the August 9 live show, it was announced that Conley had won the America's Wildcard vote.

During the final qualifying round results show on September 7, an Instant Save vote was held for viewers to send a final wildcard into the finals. The four acts included in this vote were acts that were eliminated in the live shows, with each act selected by one of the judges; Mandel selected Don McMillan, Klum selected Lily Meola, Vergara selected Celia Muñoz, and Cowell selected Players Choir. Celia Muñoz ultimately won the public vote, taking the last spot in the season's finals.

Winner | Runner-up | Third place | Finalist | Qualifier
America's Wildcard | Final Wildcard | Golden Buzzer Audition

Participant	Age(s)	Genre	Act	From	Qualifier	Result
Acapop!	12-18	Singing	A-Cappella Group	Various	4	Eliminated
Aiko Tanaka	42	Comedy	Comedian	Tokyo	2	Eliminated
Amanda Mammana	19	Singing / Music	Singer & Guitarist	Trumbull, Connecticut	3	Eliminated
Amazing Veranica & Her Incredible Friends	12	Animals	Dog Act	Oxford, Florida	1	Eliminated
Amoukanama	—N/a	Acrobatics	Acrobatic Group	Conakry, Guinea	1	Eliminated
Aubrey Burchell	21	Singing	Singer	Pittsburgh	5	Eliminated
Ava Swiss	18	Singing	Singer	Oxford, Michigan	1	Eliminated
Avery Dixon	21	Music	Saxophonist	Atlanta	1	Finalist
Bayley Graham	22	Dance	Tap Dancer	Christchurch, New Zealand	4	Eliminated
Ben Lapidus	29	Comedy / Singing / Music	Comic Singer & Guitarist	Doylestown, Pennsylvania	1	Eliminated
Blade 2 Blade	—N/a	Danger	Knife Throwing Duo	Mallorca, Spain	5	Eliminated
Celia Muñoz	36	Comedy	Ventriloquist	Madrid, Spain	3	Finalist
Chapel Hart	—N/a	Singing	Vocal Trio	Poplarville, Mississippi	2	Grand-finalist
Cline Twins	17	Variety	Hockey Trick Shot Duo	Waterloo, Ontario	3	Eliminated
Don McMillan	62	Comedy	Comedian	San Francisco	1	Eliminated
Drake Milligan	23	Singing / Music	Singer & Guitarist	Fort Worth, Texas	1	Third place
Duo Rings	—N/a	Acrobatics	Aerial Duo	Buenos Aires, Argentina	2	Eliminated
Freckled Zelda	19	Singing / Music	Singer & Instrumentalist	South Lake Tahoe, California	2	Eliminated
Funkanometry	19 & 20	Dance	Dance Duo	Vancouver Island, Canada	3	Eliminated
Fusion Japan	—N/a	Dance	Dance Group	Japan	2	Eliminated
Harper	10	Singing	Metal Singer	Somerset, England	4	Eliminated
Hayden Kristal	—N/a	Comedy	Comedian	Pueblo, Colorado	3	Eliminated
Jack Williams	25	Comedy	Ventriloquist	Indianapolis, Indiana	4	Eliminated
Jannick Holste	19	Magic / Dance	Magician & Dancer	Germany	4	Eliminated
JoJo and Bri	—N/a	Singing	Vocal Duo	Virginia	3	Eliminated
Jordan Conley	—N/a	Comedy	Comedian	Garden Grove, California	5	Eliminated
Kristen Cruz	19	Singing	Singer	Irving, Texas	5	Eliminated
Kristy Sellars	36	Dance	Pole Dancer	Ballarat, Australia	5	Runner-up
Lace Larrabee	—N/a	Comedy	Comedian	Atlanta	1	Eliminated
Lee Collinson	21	Singing	Singer	Southampton, England	4	Eliminated
Lily Meola	27	Singing	Singer	Maui, Hawaii	4	Eliminated
MPLUSPLUS	—N/a	Dance	LED Dance Group	Tokyo	3	Eliminated
Madison Taylor Baez (Note: Terry Crews had Madison Taylor Baez planted in the audience so that she could surprise the judges with her act.)	11	Singing	Singer	Yorba Linda, California	2	Eliminated
Max Ostler	18	Dance	Contemporary Dancer	Glenmore Park, Australia	5	Eliminated
Mayyas	13-25	Dance	Dance Group	Lebanon	5	Winner
Merissa Beddows	23	Singing / Comedy	Impressionist	Yonkers, New York	4	Eliminated
Mervant Vera	—N/a	Singing / Magic	Rapper & Magician	Philadelphia	5	Eliminated
Metaphysic	—N/a	Variety	Artificial Intelligence Act	Belgium & Australia	4	Grand-finalist
Mia Morris	18	Singing / Music	Singer & Musician	Nashville	3	Eliminated
Mike E. Winfield	—N/a	Comedy	Comedian	Baltimore, Maryland	4	Finalist
Mr. Pants	—N/a	Comedy	Comedian	Brooklyn, New York	2	Eliminated
Nicolas RIBS	—N/a	Magic	Magician	Paris	3	Finalist
Oleksandr Yenivatov	—N/a	Acrobatics	Contortionist	Ukraine	1	Eliminated
Players Choir	—N/a	Singing	Choir	Various	1	Eliminated
Sara James	14	Singing	Singer	Ośno Lubuskie, Poland	3	Finalist
Shu Takada	25	Variety	Yo-Yo Artist	Tokyo	5	Eliminated
Stefanny and Yeeremy	—N/a	Dance	Salsa Duo	Colombia	1	Eliminated
The Brown Brothers	30 & 32	Comedy / Music / Singing	Impressionist & Keyboardist Duo	Annapolis, Maryland	2	Eliminated
The Lazy Generation	—N/a	Danger	Stunt Group	London	4	Eliminated
The Pack Drumline	—N/a	Music	Percussion Group	Chicago	2	Eliminated
Travis Japan	23-27	Singing	J-Pop Band	Tokyo	5	Eliminated
urbancrew (Flyers of the South)	—N/a	Dance	Dance Group	Metro Manila, Philippines	5	Eliminated
Wyn Starks	39	Singing	Singer	Nashville	2	Eliminated
XOMG POP!	10-15	Singing	Girl Group	Various	3	Eliminated
Yu Hojin	29	Magic	Magician	Seoul, South Korea	2	Finalist

=== Qualifiers summary ===
Buzzed Out | Advanced to Finals | Eliminated (Top 3) | Eliminated (Top 5)

==== Qualifier 1 (August 9) ====
Guest Performer, Results Show: Dustin Tavella with Sarah Hyland

Participant	Order	Buzzes				Result (August 10)
Participant	Order	Cowell	Vergara	Klum	Mandel	Result (August 10)
Amoukanama	1					Eliminated (Top 5)
Amazing Veranica & Her Incredible Friends	2					Eliminated
Ava Swiss	3					Eliminated
Ben Lapidus	4			^{1}		Eliminated
Lace Larrabee	5					Eliminated
Drake Milligan	6					Advanced
Oleksandr Yenivatov	7					Eliminated
Players Choir	8					Eliminated (Top 5)
Stefanny and Yeeremy	9					Eliminated
Don McMillan	10					Eliminated (Top 3)
Avery Dixon	11					Advanced

- ^1 Klum's buzzer was pressed by Cowell at the end of Ben Lapidus' performance.

==== Qualifier 2 (August 16) ====
Guest Performer, Results Show: Jon Dorenbos

Participant	Order	Buzzes				Result (August 17)
Participant	Order	Cowell	Vergara	Klum	Mandel	Result (August 17)
The Pack Drumline	1					Eliminated
The Brown Brothers	2					Eliminated (Top 5)
Mr. Pants	3					Eliminated
Fusion Japan	4					Eliminated
Freckled Zelda	5					Eliminated
Duo Rings	6					Eliminated (Top 5)
Wyn Starks	7					Eliminated
Aiko Tanaka	8					Eliminated
Madison Taylor Baez	9					Eliminated (Top 3)
Yu Hojin	10					Advanced
Chapel Hart	11					Advanced

==== Qualifier 3 (August 23) ====
Guest Performers, Results Show: Kodi Lee with Teddy Swims and Neal Schon

Participant	Order	Buzzes				Result (August 24)
Participant	Order	Cowell	Vergara	Klum	Mandel	Result (August 24)
MPLUSPLUS	1					Eliminated
JoJo and Bri	2					Eliminated
Cline Twins	3					Eliminated
Amanda Mammana	4					Eliminated (Top 5)
XOMG POP!	5					Eliminated
Nicolas RIBS	6					Advanced
Mia Morris	7					Eliminated
Hayden Kristal	8					Eliminated (Top 5)
Celia Muñoz ^{2}	9					Eliminated (Top 3)
Funkanometry	10					Eliminated
Sara James	11					Advanced

- ^2 Celia Muñoz was later brought back as a Wildcard act for the Finals.

==== Qualifier 4 (August 30) ====
Guest Performers, Results Show: Piff the Magic Dragon and Riverdance

Participant	Order	Buzzes				Result (August 31)
Participant	Order	Cowell	Vergara	Klum	Mandel	Result (August 31)
Bayley Graham	1					Eliminated
Acapop!	2					Eliminated
Jannick Holste	3					Eliminated
Lee Collinson	4					Eliminated
Jack Williams	5					Eliminated (Top 5)
Metaphysic	6					Advanced
The Lazy Generation	7					Eliminated
Merissa Beddows	8					Eliminated (Top 5)
Harper	9					Eliminated
Mike E. Winfield	10					Advanced
Lily Meola	11					Eliminated (Top 3)

==== Qualifier 5 (September 6) ====
Guest Performer, Results Show: Cast of & Juliet

Participant	Order	Buzzes				Result (September 7)
Participant	Order	Cowell	Vergara	Klum	Mandel	Result (September 7)
Kristen Cruz	1					Eliminated (Top 5)
Mervant Vera	2					Eliminated (Top 3)
Travis Japan	3					Eliminated
Max Ostler	4					Eliminated
Jordan Conley	5					Eliminated
Kristy Sellars	6					Advanced
Blade 2 Blade	7					Eliminated
urbancrew (Flyers of the South)	8					Eliminated (Top 5)
Aubrey Burchell	9					Eliminated
Shu Takada	10					Eliminated
Mayyas	11					Advanced

=== Finals (September 13–14) ===
Guest Performers, Results Show: Black Eyed Peas and Light Balance

Winner | Runner-up | 3rd place | Top 5

Finalist	Performed with (2nd Performance)	Result (September 14)
Avery Dixon	Trombone Shorty	Finalist
Celia Muñoz	Terry Fator and Darci Lynne	Finalist
Chapel Hart	Darius Rucker ^{4}	Grand-finalist
Drake Milligan	Jon Pardi ^{4}	3rd
Kristy Sellars	N/A ^{6}	2nd
Mayyas	N/A ^{6}	1st
Metaphysic	Jeff Ross, Don McMillan, Mr. Pants, and Lace Larrabee ^{5}	Grand-finalist
Mike E. Winfield	Jeff Ross, Don McMillan, Mr. Pants, and Lace Larrabee ^{5}	Finalist
Nicolas RIBS	Shin Lim ^{3}	Finalist
Sara James	Black Eyed Peas	Finalist
Yu Hojin	Shin Lim ^{3}	Finalist

- ^3 Nicolas RIBS and Yu Hojin conducted a joint routine for their second performance, and thus shared the same guest performer.
- ^4 Chapel Hart and Drake Milligan conducted a joint routine for their second performance, and thus shared the same guest performers.
- ^5 Metaphysic and Mike E. Winfield conducted a joint routine for their second performance, and thus shared the same guest performers.
- ^6 Kristy Sellars and Mayyas conducted a joint routine for their second performance.

== Ratings ==
Viewership and ratings per episode of America's Got Talent season 17
No.	Title	Air date	Timeslot (ET)	Rating (18–49)	Viewers (millions)	DVR (18–49)	DVR viewers (millions)	Total (18–49)	Total viewers (millions)	Ref.
1	"Auditions 1"	May 31, 2022	Tuesday 8:00 p.m.	0.8	6.33	TBD	TBD	TBD	TBD	
2	"Auditions 2"	June 7, 2022	Tuesday 8:00 p.m.	0.8	6.37	TBD	TBD	TBD	TBD	
3	"Auditions 3"	June 14, 2022	Tuesday 8:00 p.m.	0.8	6.21	TBD	TBD	TBD	TBD	
4	"Auditions 4"	June 21, 2022	Tuesday 8:00 p.m.	0.7	6.00	TBD	TBD	TBD	TBD	
5	"Auditions 5"	June 28, 2022	Tuesday 8:00 p.m.	0.6	5.98	TBD	TBD	TBD	TBD	
6	"Simon's Favorite Golden Buzzers"	July 5, 2022	Tuesday 8:00 p.m.	0.6	5.49	TBD	TBD	TBD	TBD	
7	"Auditions 6"	July 12, 2022	Tuesday 8:00 p.m.	0.7	6.43	TBD	TBD	TBD	TBD	
8	"Auditions 7"	July 19, 2022	Tuesday 8:00 p.m.	0.6	6.15	TBD	TBD	TBD	TBD	
9	"Auditions 8"	July 26, 2022	Tuesday 8:00 p.m.	0.8	6.47	TBD	TBD	TBD	TBD	
10	"Auditions End and Judge Deliberations"	August 2, 2022	Tuesday 8:00 p.m.	0.7	6.24	TBD	TBD	TBD	TBD	
11	"Qualifiers 1"	August 9, 2022	Tuesday 8:00 p.m.	0.7	6.45	TBD	TBD	TBD	TBD	
12	"Qualifiers 1 Results"	August 10, 2022	Wednesday 8:00 p.m.	0.5	5.50	TBD	TBD	TBD	TBD	
13	"Qualifiers 2"	August 16, 2022	Tuesday 8:00 p.m.	0.7	6.44	TBD	TBD	TBD	TBD	
14	"Qualifiers 2 Results"	August 17, 2022	Wednesday 8:00 p.m.	0.6	5.64	TBD	TBD	TBD	TBD	
15	"Qualifiers 3"	August 23, 2022	Tuesday 8:00 p.m.	0.7	6.33	TBD	TBD	TBD	TBD	
16	"Qualifiers 3 Results"	August 24, 2022	Wednesday 8:00 p.m.	0.6	5.55	TBD	TBD	TBD	TBD	
17	"Qualifiers 4"	August 30, 2022	Tuesday 8:00 p.m.	0.7	6.36	TBD	TBD	TBD	TBD	
18	"Qualifiers 4 Results"	August 31, 2022	Wednesday 8:00 p.m.	0.5	5.48	TBD	TBD	TBD	TBD	
19	"Qualifiers 5"	September 6, 2022	Tuesday 8:00 p.m.	0.7	6.11	TBD	TBD	TBD	TBD	
20	"Qualifiers 5 Results"	September 7, 2022	Wednesday 8:00 p.m.	0.6	5.69	TBD	TBD	TBD	TBD	
21	"Finale"	September 13, 2022	Tuesday 8:00 p.m.	0.8	7.03	TBD	TBD	TBD	TBD	
22	"Finale Results"	September 14, 2022	Wednesday 9:00 p.m.	0.6	6.82	TBD	TBD	TBD	TBD	
