= Adrian Stoica =

Romanian-born dog trainer in Italy

- Born: Brașov, Romania
- Occupation: Dog trainer
- Known for: America's Got Talent season 18 winner

Adrian Stoica is a Romanian-born dog trainer in Italy who is best known for winning season 18 of America's Got Talent along with his dog, Hurricane in 2023.

== Background ==
=== Adrian Stoica ===
Adrian Stoica was born in Brașov, Romania, and was 45 as of 2023, having migrated to Italy at age 20. He is a professional dog trainer. Adrian has been a dog trainer for several years and has been a six-time disc dog world champion. He has gained fame for his proficiency in training dogs. Adrian has participated in multiple national and international competitions with his dogs. Prior to auditioning for America's Got Talent, Stoica and Hurricane participated in Italia's Got Talent in 2017, and Românii au talent in 2018 and 2022.

=== Hurricane ===
Hurricane was born in 2014 in Romania. Hurricane is a female Border Collie who was abandoned as a puppy, but after being abandoned, Adrian rescued her.

== America's Got Talent ==
In 2023, Stoica and Hurricane entered the eighteenth season of America's Got Talent. They made it to the final where they won US $1,000,000 and a show in Las Vegas. At the final on 27 September, they beat out runner-up Anna DeGuzman and third place Murmuration. They became the second dog act, after Olate Dogs, to win the show.

== After America's Got Talent ==
Following their win, Stoica and Hurricane were one of 40 acts that previously appeared on a Got Talent show globally, to be nominated for the spin-off series, America's Got Talent: Fantasy League, which began on 1 January 2024. Stoica Hurricane competed on the team mentored by Simon Cowell, with their initial performance airing on 8 January. They were eliminated in the semi-finals on 5 February.
