= Travis Japan =

Japanese pop music group

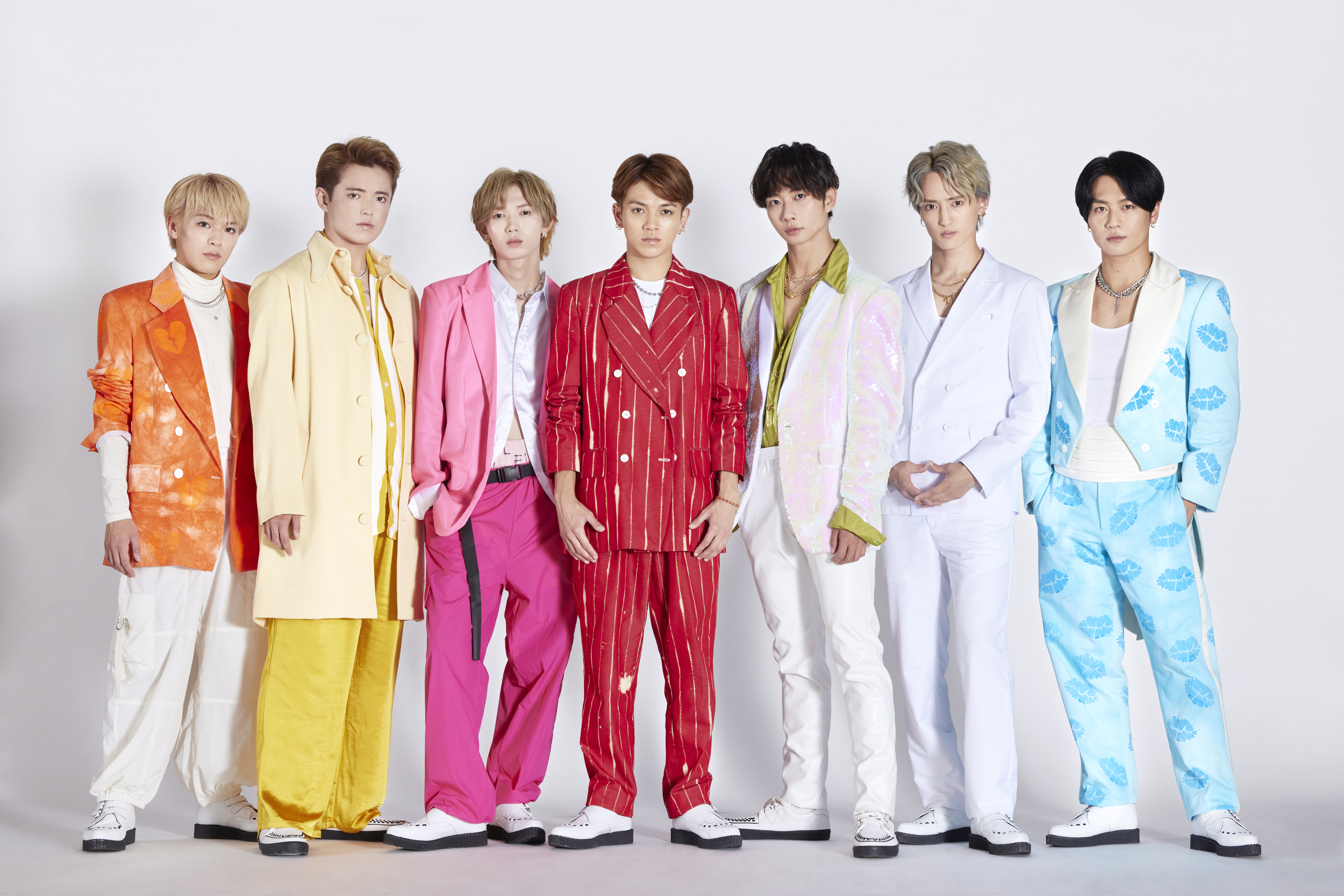
- Travis Japan in 2022, From left to right: Kaito Matsukura, Shizuya Yoshizawa, Ryuya Shimekake, Kaito Miyachika, Kaito Nakamura, Noel Kawashima, Genta Matsuda

Background information
- Origin: Tokyo, Japan
- Genre: J-pop
- Years active: 2012–present
- Labels: Capitol; UJ
- Members: Kaito Miyachika; Kaito Nakamura; Ryuya Shimekake; Noel Kawashima; Shizuya Yoshizawa; Genta Matsuda; Kaito Matsukura
- Website: www.universal-music.co.jp/travisjapan/

Travis Japan is a Japanese boy band managed by Starto Entertainment. Their name is a tribute to the American choreographer Travis Payne, who assisted in their 2012 group formation during the production of stage show Playzone'12 Song & Danc'n. Partii. The group resided in Los Angeles, California in March to October 2022, to study English and train with local choreographers and vocal coaches.

== History ==
=== 2012–2017: Formation and member changes ===
In February 2012, while watching a play, Yoshizawa, Nakamura, Abe, Miyachika, Kajiyama and other Johnny's Jr were called to the rehearsal room, where they met with Travis Payne. Nakada, Kawashima, Morita, and Shimekake, active at that time as Jr. A, and who were later called "Older Brothers", were also there. By then, Travis Japan was formed with the five members mentioned first, whom were later called the "Younger Brothers", but in July it was informed that the nine would act as Travis Japan in Playzone'12 Song & Danc'n。Partii.

By 2015, they would continue performing in Playzone, but they would also be chosen as back dancers for Masahiko Kondō, Arashi and Tackey & Tsubasa.

By 2016, the subgroups' relationship as one group had not deepened, and they had even thought of appearing as "Older Brothers" and "Younger Brothers" in "Johnny's Ginza 2016" in May 2016, but reconsidered after the possibility of losing their job after the end of Playzone. Shortly after that, Abe expressed his intention of leaving. By October 2016's performances, the group was made up of 8 members. It continued like that until January 2017's "JOHNNYS' ALL STARS IsLAND", where this time, Nakada was the one mentioning his desire to pursue his dream.

Without Abe and Nakada, Travis Japan had 7 members working during their performances in 2017. In September's "Johnny's You&Me IsLAND", Morita was absent, leaving the group with 6 members. Information about the start of the Fuji Television variety show "Johnny's Jr.dex", as well as "Johnny's Happy New Year IsLAND" event in October lacked Kajiyama's name, leaving the group with 5 members. After that, at the performance of "Odaiba Odoriba Saturday and Sunday Playground" on November 18, 2017, 7 people appeared, including Genta Matsuda and Kaito Matsukura, who were active as back dancers for Sexy Zone and the stage performance "Endless Shock". The performance was actually an audition for Matsuda and Matsukura to see if they would join the group. They later revealed that they were told that for them to join, they would have to appear with the other five. The seven-men group appeared in the December broadcast of "Johnny's Jr. dex".

=== 2018–2022: Pre-debut activities ===
In March 2018, on the "Johnny's web" official site, regular posts started on their blog. Official member colors were revealed in the "About" page. On August 8, 2019, they opened an official Instagram page. By October 10, 2022, they accumulated 980,000 followers.

They became the first Johnny's act to perform with an overseas artist, when they participated as special guests at the "Austin Mahone Japan Tour 2019" on October 14 and 15, 2019. In 2019 they performed at the sold-out "Tora-ja ~ NINJAPAN" planned and composed originally by Johnny Kitagawa and directed by Hideaki Takizawa. The performance lasted for 3 years.

The group held their first Johnny's Jr solo concert at "Summer Paradise 2020", on August 1–10, 2020. They also performed at Arashi's last concert before hiatus, "This is Arashi Live", on December 31, 2020.

"+81 Dance Studio" is the name of the YouTube channel opened on August 25, 2021, the first one for a Johnny's Jr. solo (group) act. Their performances there are of new dance versions of classic J&A artists songs. The first song dance-covered there was Arashi's "Love So Sweet". They were the only Jr. group to perform at "Johnny's Festival – Thank you 2021 Hello 2022" on December 30, 2021, after receiving an offer from Arashi's Jun Matsumoto, who produced the event, as back dancers for KinKi Kids. On March 3, 2022, on an Instagram Live, members informed of their travel to Los Angeles, California to study. On March 28, 2022, they competed in the World of Dance Championship Series – Orange County 2022, earning third place in the team category and winning the Best Costume and Crowd Favorite categories. On July 13, 2022, they auditioned for America's Got Talent, qualifying for the live shows' semifinals on August 13. On July 19, 2022, Yoshizawa announced a temporary hiatus due to tendonitis, returning to activities after August 13.

=== 2022–present: Debut and later activity ===
On September 29, 2022, it was revealed that they would be signed to Capitol Records, a subsidiary of Universal Music, and would make their worldwide major debut with their first single on October 28, 2022, first debut at the firm in nearly 11 months since Naniwa Danshi. The group opened a new official website, Twitter and TikTok. A solo YouTube channel was also launched On October 10, 2022, the name of their debut song was released. A teaser of "Just Dance!" was released on their YouTube channel.

Travis Japan got called back to perform on America's Got Talent in 2024, for their special Fantasy League show that aired 22 January 2024, singing their debut song "Just Dance", after having a disappointing performance and mixed reactions from the judges in their appearance at the semifinals in August 2022, which cost them a red buzzer vote from Howie Mandel barely at the start of their performance. This time, they received praises from all the judges, especially from former Spice Girls member Mel B, who was their coach. Unfortunately, the group did not make it past the qualifying round.

== Members ==
Current members

- Kaito Miyachika (宮近海斗) - Chaka
- Kaito Nakamura (中村海人) - Umi [pronunciation: woo-me]
- Ryuya Shimekake (七五三掛龍也) - Shime [pronunciation: she-may]
- Noel Kawashima (川島如恵留) - Noel
- Shizuya Yoshizawa (吉澤閑也) - Shizu [pronunciation: see-zoo]
- Genta Matsuda (松田元太) - Genta
- Kaito Matsukura (松倉海斗) - Machu

Former members

- Aran Abe (阿部顕嵐)
- Hyakuna Hiroki (百名ヒロキ) (formerly known as Hiroki Nakada (仲田拡輝))
- Myuto Morita (森田美勇人)
- Asahi Kajiyama (梶山朝日)

== Filmography ==
=== Television programs ===
Year	Title	Details	Notes	Ref(s)
2025	Travis Japan no JUST! Shin Nihon Isan	Two members of Travis Japan embark on a journey each week to uncover Japan's lesser-known treasures, while facing unexpected challenges.		

== Discography ==
=== Studio albums ===
List of studio albums, with selected details, chart positions, sales and certifications
Title	Details	Peak positions			Sales	Certifications
Title	Details	JPN	JPN Cmb.	JPN Hot	Sales	Certifications
Road to A	Released: December 20, 2023; Label: Capitol, UJ; Formats: CD, digital download, streaming	1	1	1	JPN: 153,457	RIAJ: Gold (phy.)
Viisual	Released: December 4, 2024; Label: Capitol, UJ; Formats: CD, CD+BD, CD+DVD, digital download, streaming	1	1	1	JPN: 141,371	RIAJ: Gold (phy.)
'S Travelers	Released: December 1, 2025; Label: Capitol, UJ; Formats: CD, CD+BD, digital download, streaming	1	1	1	JPN: 148,145	RIAJ: Gold (phy.)
Jewelry Basket	Scheduled: November 18, 2026; Label: Capitol, UJ; Formats: CD, CD+BD, digital download, streaming	To be released				

=== Extended plays ===
List of extended plays, with selected details, chart positions and sales
Title	Details	Peaks	Sales
Title	Details	JPN Cmb.	Sales
Moving Pieces – EP	Released: June 5, 2023; Label: Capitol, UJ; Formats: Digital download, streaming; Track listing: 1. "Moving Pieces"; 2. "Charging!"; 3. "Still on a Journey"; 4. "Keep On Smiling"	5	JPN: 19,167

=== Singles ===
List of singles, with selected chart positions, showing year released, and album name
Title	Year	Peak positions				Sales	Certifications	Album
Title	Year	JPN	JPN Cmb.	JPN Hot	WW	Sales	Certifications	Album
"Just Dance!"	2022	—	7	4	28			Road to A
"Moving Pieces"	2023	—	4	3	—			Road to A
"Candy Kiss"	2023	—	4	2	—			Road to A
"T.G.I. Friday Night"	2024	—	7	2	— (Note: "T.G.I. Friday Night" did not enter the Billboard Global 200, but peaked at number 105 on the Global Excl. US.)			Viisual
"Sweetest Tune"	2024	—	5	2	—			Viisual
"Say I Do"	2025	1	1	1	—	JPN: 143,360	RIAJ: Gold (phy.)	'S Travelers
"Tokyo Crazy Night"	2025	1	1	24	—	JPN: 143,360	RIAJ: Gold (phy.)	'S Travelers
"Would You Like One?"	2025	—	12	9	—			'S Travelers
"Kagenimo-Hinatanimo"	2026	1	1	1	—	JPN: 272,142	RIAJ: Platinum (phy.)	Jewelry Basket
"On My Road" (Stadium version)	2026	—	29	18	—			Non-album single
"—" denotes releases that did not chart or were not released in that region.

=== Promotional singles ===
List of promotional singles, with selected chart positions, showing year released, and album name
Title	Year	Peaks		Sales	Album
Title	Year	JPN Cmb.	JPN Hot	Sales	Album
"Level Up"	2023	—	68		Road to A
"Crazy Crazy"	2024	6	10	JPN: 20,748 (dig.)	Viisual
"Fly Higher"	2024	6	65	JPN: 14,666 (dig.)	Viisual
"Bo$$y"	2024	—	71		Viisual
"Disco Baby"	2025	13	7		'S Travelers
"Welcome to Our Show Tonight"	2025	—	40		'S Travelers
"Ego"	2026	17	8		Jewelry Basket
"Checkmate"	2026	21	—		Jewelry Basket
"—" denotes releases that did not chart or were not released in that region.

=== Other charted songs ===
List of other charted songs, with selected chart positions, showing year released, and album name
Title	Year	Peaks	Album
Title	Year	JPN Hot	Album
"Still on a Journey"	2023	65	Road to A
"Burning Love"	2025	80	Lilo & Stitch (Japanese Original Motion Picture Soundtrack)
"As We Are"	2026	54	TBA

=== Original songs ===
Title	Lyrics by	Music by	JASRAC
Yume no Hollywood （夢のHollywood）	Ma-saya	Josef Melin	1L0-3418-9
Dance With Me 〜Lesson 1〜	Komei Kobayashi	Figge Boström; Josef Melin	1L4-1272-8
Happy Groovy	Aya Harukazu	Takarot; Didrik Thott	1L7-0920-8
Lock Lock	Mine	O-Bankz; Erik Lidbom; Christofer Erixon	1L9-7780-6
VOLCANO	Satoru Kurihara	Hikari Geek Boy / Al Swettenham	1M9-3827-8
Talk it! Make it!	Komei Kobayashi	Josef Melin	1N1-9560-1
Namida no Kessho （Namidaの結晶）	Susumu Kawaguchi	Takashi Tsushimi; Susumu Kawaguchi	249-4116-6
Unique Tigers	Travis Japan	A. K. Janeway	249-4117-4
FREE YOUR MIND	Komei Kobayashi	Josef Melin	1N8-4094-8
BLUE MASQUERADE	Komei Kobayashi	José Manuel Moles; Paula Guasp; Roger Argemí Tutusaus	1N8-6975-0
Together Now	Komei Kobayashi	Kenichi Sakamuro; Figge Boström	1N8-3838-2
GET ALIVE	Funk Uchino	Susumu Kawaguchi; Steven Lee; Drew Ryan Scott; Jimmy Andrew Richard	1O4-8163-1
The Show	Hikari	Hikari; Samdell	1P3-4645-2
BIG BANG BOY	Yui Mugino	Peter Ants Nord	1P9-6630-2
To the Top	Komei Kobayashi	Ronnie Icon; Willie Weeks	1Q1-5898-6
Bring Back	Shun Kusakawa	Erik Lidbom; Gustav Mared; Michael Lee Cheung / MLC	1Q1-5900-1
Party Up Like Crazy	Steven Lee	Steven Lee; Takuya Harada	1Q6-3994-1

== Music videos ==
List of music videos
Title	Year	Ref.
Namida no KESSHO	2019	
Big Bang Boy	2021	
Just Dance	2022	
Moving Pieces	2023	
Candy Kiss	2023	
Level Up	2023	
Okie Dokie!	2023	
T.G.I. Friday Night	2024	
Sweetest Tune	2024	
Crazy Crazy	2024	

== Career highlights ==
=== Special events ===
- YouTube FanFest 2021 (December 11, 2021) Online
- RISING JAPAN MUSICFEST (June 11–12, 2022) Silverlakes Sports Complex
- Anime Expo (July 2–4, 2022) Los Angeles Convention Center
- Nisei Week(August 14, 2022) Los Angeles
- UNIK Asia Festival (December 10, 2022) Central Harbourfront, Hong Kong

=== International TV programs ===
- The Shonen Club (2012 - ) NHK BS Premium
- America's Got Talent (season 17) (July 12, 2022) NBC
  - AGT: Fantasy League (January 1, 2024) Their performance aired 22 January 2024.

=== Dance contests ===
- World of Dance Championship Series Orange County 2022 (March 27, 2022) House of Blues Anaheim
- Prelude Las Vegas 2022 (May 28, 2022) Artemus W. Ham Concert Hall
- World of Dance Championship Week (July 29–31, 2022) The Source OC

=== Concerts and solo shows ===
- Odaiba Odoriba Sat/Sun Asobiba (November 18–19, 2017) Odaiba Wangan Studio
- Johnnys' Jr. Festival 2018 (February 26, 2018) Yokohama Arena
- Summer Paradise 2018 (August 18–24, 2018) TOKYO DOME CITY HALL
- Travis Japan Concert 2019 〜Present〜 (March 26, 2019) Yokohama Arena
- Johnnys IsLAND Festival (May 25–26, 2019) Saitama Super Arena
- Summer Paradise 2019 (August 10–22, 2019) TOKYO DOME CITY HALL
- Austin Mahone Japan Tour 2019: Special Guest Opener (October 14–15, 2019) Yokohama Arena
- Summer Paradise 2020 (August 1–10, 2020)
- Travis Japan LIVE 2020 ENTER 1234567 (September 26–27, 2020) Yokohama Arena
- Travis Japan Live tour 2021 IMAGE NATION (March 22 - July 16, 2021) 12 City / 33 Venue National Tour

=== Stage ===
- PLAYZONE'12 SONG & DANC'N。PARTII。(July 9 - August 10, 2012) Aoyama Theatre
- Live House Johnny's Ginza 2013 (May 20–21, 2013) Theatre Creation
- PLAYZONE'13 SONG & DANC'N。PARTIII。 (July 3 - August 10, 2013) Aoyama Theatre
- ANOTHER (September 4–28, 2013) Nissay Theatre。
- PLAYZONE→IN NISSAY (January 7–28, 2014) Nissay Theatre
- PLAYZONE 1986...2014★Thank You! 〜Aoyama Theatre★ (July 6 - August 9, 2014) Aoyama Theatre
- ★Farewell!〜Aoyama Theatre★PLAYZONE 30YEARS★1232 (January 6–22, 2015), Aoyama Theatre
- Johnny's Ginza 2016 (May 2–6, 2016), Theatre Creation
- ABC-Za 2016〜OH&YEAH!!〜 (October 5–27, 2016) Nissay Theatre
- JOHNNYS' ALL STARS IsLAND (December 3, 2016 - January 24, 2017, Tokyo Imperial Theatre
- Johnny's Ginza 2017 (May 6–10, 2017) Theatre Creation
- JOHNNYS' YOU&ME IsLAND（2017年9月6日 - 30日、帝国劇場）
- ABC-Za Johnny's Legend 2017 (October 7–28, 2017) Nissay Theatre
- JOHNNYS' Happy New Year IsLAND (January 1–27, 2018) Tokyo Imperial Theatre
- JOHNNYS' King & Prince IsLAND (December 6, 2018 - January 27, 2019) Tokyo Imperial Theatre
- TORA JA-NINJAPAN- (November 2–10, 2019) Sunshine Theatre / (November 15–24, 2019) Kyōto Shijō Minami-za / (November 26–27, 2019) Misonoza / (November 30, 2019) Ueno Gakuen Hall
- Johnny's World Happy LIVE with YOU (March 30, 2020) Tokyo Dome
- Johnny's World Happy LIVE with YOU Jr. Festival 〜Wash Your Hands〜 (August 26, 2020)
- TORA JA-NINJAPAN 2020 (October 10–27, 2020) Shinbashi Embujo
- TORA JA-NINJAPAN 2021 (October 6–28, 2021) Kyōto Shijō Minami-za / (November 3–27, 2021) Shinbashi Embujo / (December 1–8, 2021) Misonoza / (December 11–12, 2021) Hiroshima Bunka HBG Hall
