= You Can Have Him Jolene =

2021 song by Chapel Hart

Single by Chapel Hart

from the album The Girls Are Back in Town
- Released: March 18, 2021
- Genre: Country
- Length: 3:13
- Label: JT3D
- Songwriters: Danica Hart; Devynn Hart; Trea Swindle
- Producer: Jeff Glixman

Chapel Hart singles chronology
"I Will Follow" (2021)	"You Can Have Him Jolene" (2021)	"Grown Ass Woman" (2021)

"You Can Have Him Jolene" is a song written and recorded by American country music group Chapel Hart. It was released in March 2021 as a single from their self-released album The Girls Are Back in Town. It is an answer song to Dolly Parton's 1973 single "Jolene". The song gained further attention in 2022 when Chapel Hart performed it on the television talent show America's Got Talent.

== Content ==
Chapel Hart released their second studio album The Girls Are Back in Town in August 2021, with Jeff Glixman serving as producer. "You Can Have Him Jolene" was released earlier in the year as a single from this album. It is an answer song to Dolly Parton's 1973 hit "Jolene". Lyrically, the song continues on the love triangle theme of "Jolene", with the female narrator offering her male partner to the titular Jolene while warning her, "when you think that he's in love, he'll surely leave / Like he did me". Chapel Hart also recorded a music video for the song, with David Abbott directing. The video portrays the members of Chapel Hart along with wrestler Mickie James getting into a fight in a bar.

== Reception ==
Robert K. Oermann of MusicRow wrote, "The trio rocks out on this feisty whiplash ride, with their flawless vocal harmonies intact. This CMT Next Women of Country act is outstandingly talented, and so far has been batting a thousand with its releases. The video is a hoot, too." Jon Freeman and Joseph Hudak of Rolling Stone Country praised group member Danica Hart's lead vocals and the country rock style of the production.

In 2022, Chapel Hart competed during season 17 of the television talent show America's Got Talent. On the July 19 audition episode, they performed "You Can Have Him Jolene". After the performance, all four judges and the host gave them a group Golden Buzzer, which allowed the trio to advance to the next round of competition. After the performance, Parton responded on Twitter that she considered the song a "fun new take" on "Jolene". Chapel Hart eventually earned a spot in the finals.

== Chart performance ==
Following the America's Got Talent performance, "You Can Have Him Jolene" debuted at number eight on Billboard Country Digital Song Sales, with over 3,000 sales. The following week, it ascended to number four on the same chart.

Chart (2022)	Peak position
US Country Digital Song Sales (Billboard)	4
