= Ahren Belisle =

Canadian stand-up comedian (born 1995)

- Born: 1995 (age 30–31); Ontario, Canada
- Occupations: Comedian; software engineer
- Website: ahrenbelislecomedy.com

Ahren Belisle (born 1995) is a Canadian stand-up comedian. Raised in Ontario, Belisle has cerebral palsy and is mute. He uses a speech synthesis app from his phone to communicate. A former software engineer, he first did stand-up in 2022, after being encouraged by another comic at a comedy show he attended. Belisle first gather significant attention after he appeared on Tony Hinchcliffe's Kill Tony podcast in 2023. He was also a finalist in the eighteenth season of America's Got Talent.

== Life and career ==
Ahren Belisle was born in 1995, and was raised in Bonfield and North Bay, Ontario. Belisle, who has cerebral palsy and performs his comedy through a speech synthesis app on his phone. Belisle was working as a software engineer when, on a vacation in Portugal, he attended a stand-up comedy show in 2022, where he made the audience and the performers laugh from his heckling, and was encouraged to try comedy himself by the comic. In 2023, he appeared on Tony Hinchcliffe's Kill Tony podcast, generating such a positive reaction that he was given a "Golden Ticket" to allow him to appear on the show anytime he wanted. After one of Belisle's friends submitted his TikTok videos to NBC, he was solicited by the producers of America's Got Talent to participate in the season. Later that year, he appeared in the eighteenth season of the show, where he was a finalist.

He has stated that performing through a text-to-speech app has both negative and positive aspects, as the technology doesn't always work properly, but the delay (as he types) builds up an extra layer of comedic tension. In 2024 he appeared in All Access Comedy, a stand-up comedy special hosted by D.J. Demers for AMI-tv to highlight comedians with disabilities. He and the other performers on the special received an ensemble Canadian Screen Award nomination for Best Writing in a Variety or Sketch Comedy Program or Series at the 13th Canadian Screen Awards in 2025.
