= Sainted Trap Choir =

American musical ensemble

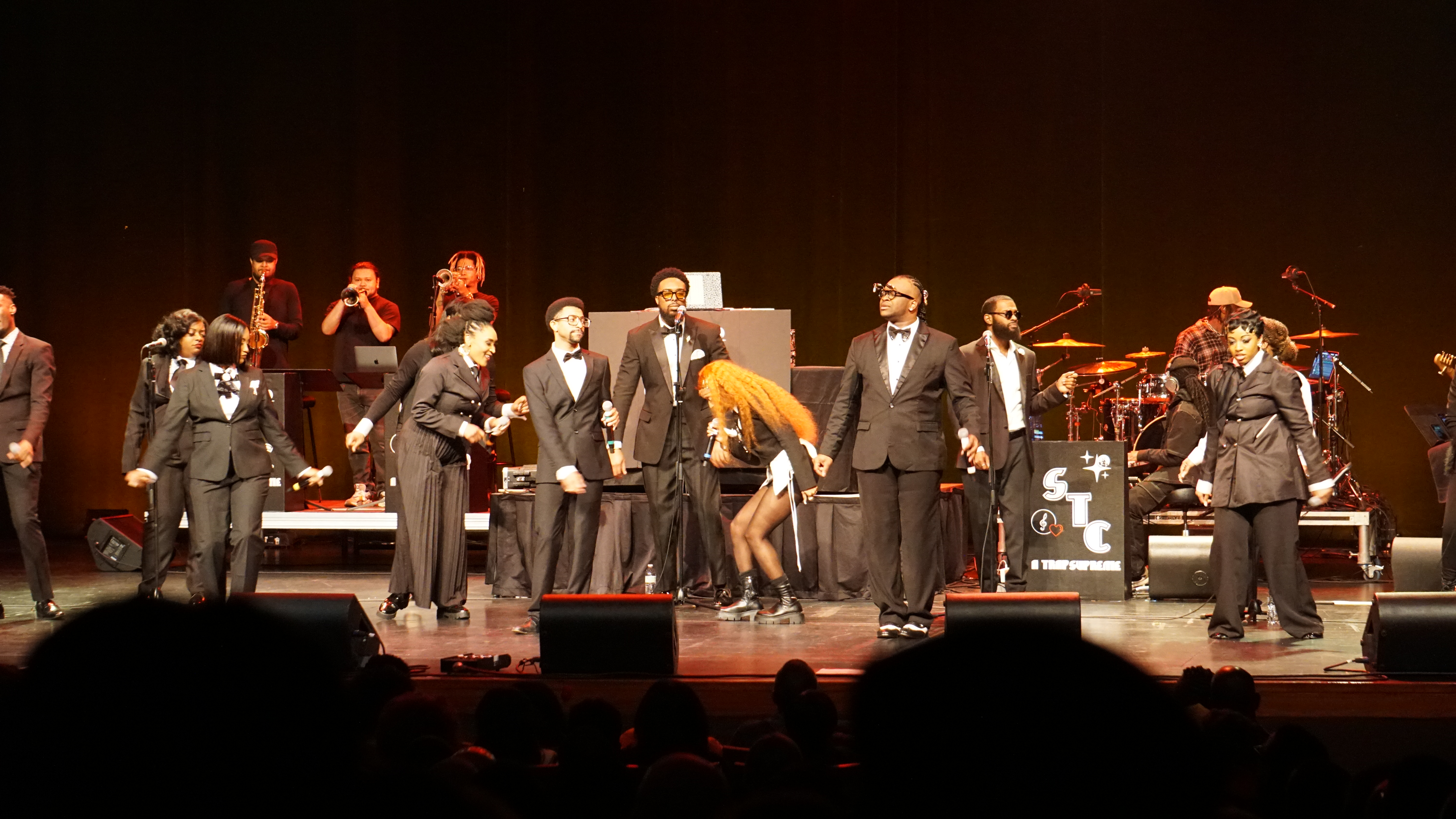
- Sainted Trap Choir performs at Knight Theater, Charlotte, NC, January 25, 2025.

Background information
- Origin: Charlotte, North Carolina
- Years active: 2020–present
- Members: DJ Fannie Mae; Dennis Reed, Jr.

Sainted Trap Choir is a musical ensemble from Charlotte, North Carolina founded in 2020 by friends and creative collaborators DJ Fannie Mae and musician and bandleader Dennis Reed Jr. Both Mae and Reed describe Sainted as a bridge between southern gospel church culture and hip-hop/trap music, combining high-energy vocal harmonies, choreography, and contemporary sound.

== Background ==
Reed had the idea to create a choir that blended trap music with traditional gospel music after seeing artist 2 Chainz perform with a choir. Sainted Trap Choir's first performance was held at The Underground, in Charlotte, NC in February 2020.

== Members ==
Co-founder Fannie Mae is the official DJ for Charlotte FC soccer club. She also hosts regular DJ and music-themed events in Charlotte and in other cities, including her trademarked "Fannie's Hang Suite." Dennis Reed, Jr. is the founder of the youth-centered Charlotte-based nonprofit Inspire The Fire and also served as the Musical Artist-in-Residence for the Harvey B. Gantt Center for African-American Arts + Culture's 50th anniversary.

== America's Got Talent ==
In 2023, Sainted Trap Choir competed on the NBC television talent show, America's Got Talent and made it to the semifinals. In 2024, Sainted returned to AGT spinoff, America's Got Talent: Fantasy League where they made it to the finalist round before elimination.

== Port of Miami 2oth Anniversary Tour with Rick Ross ==
In the summer of 2026, Sainted Trap Choir and Atlanta's Renaissance Orchestra joined Rick Ross on his Port of Miami 20th Anniversary Tour.

== Reception ==
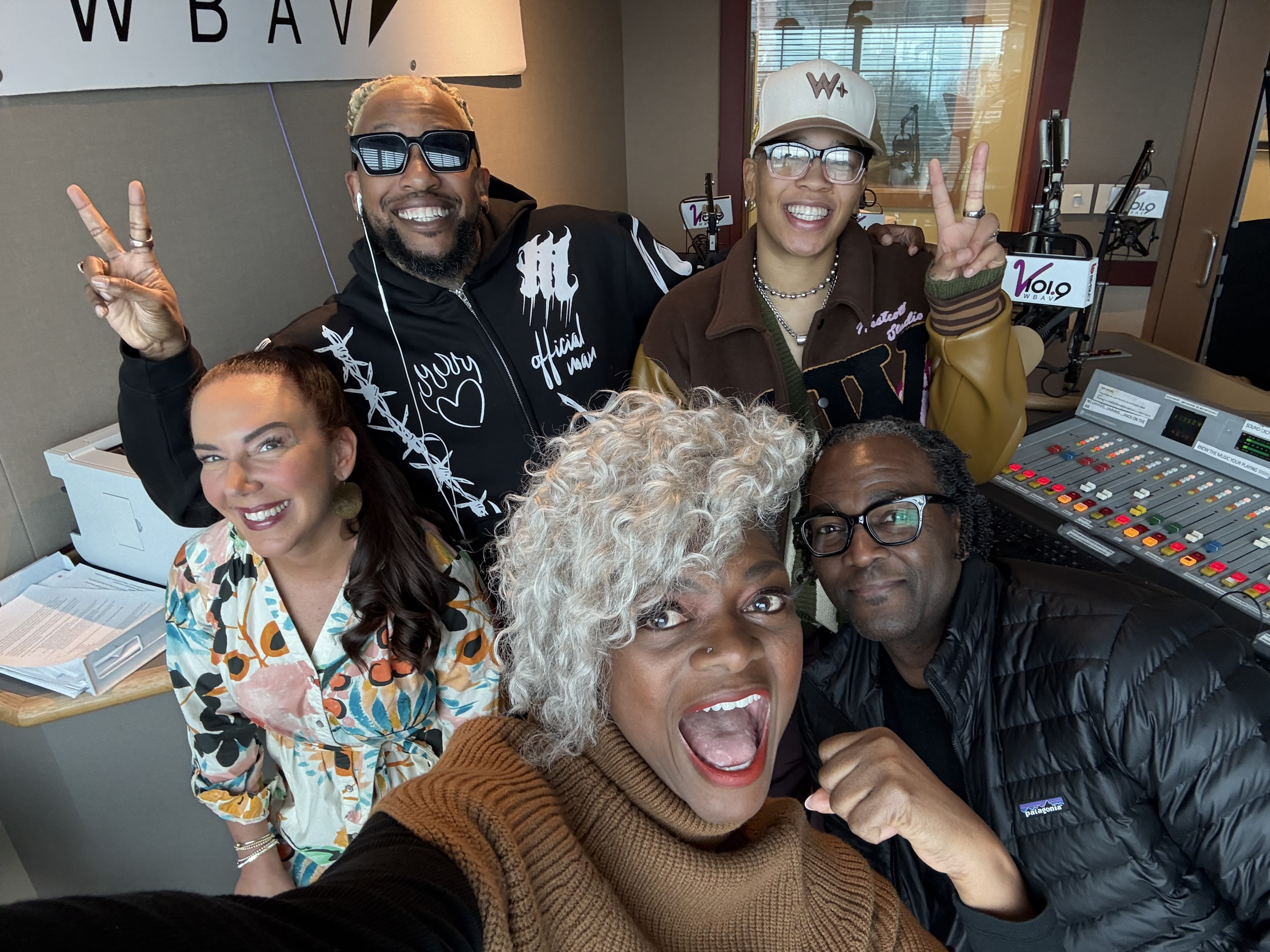
Sainted Co-founders DJ Fannie Mae and Dennis Reed Jr. make a promotional appearance on Charlotte's V101 to discuss their concert as part of the 2025 Black Notes Project music festival.
