= Chapel Hart =

Country music group from Mississippi, US

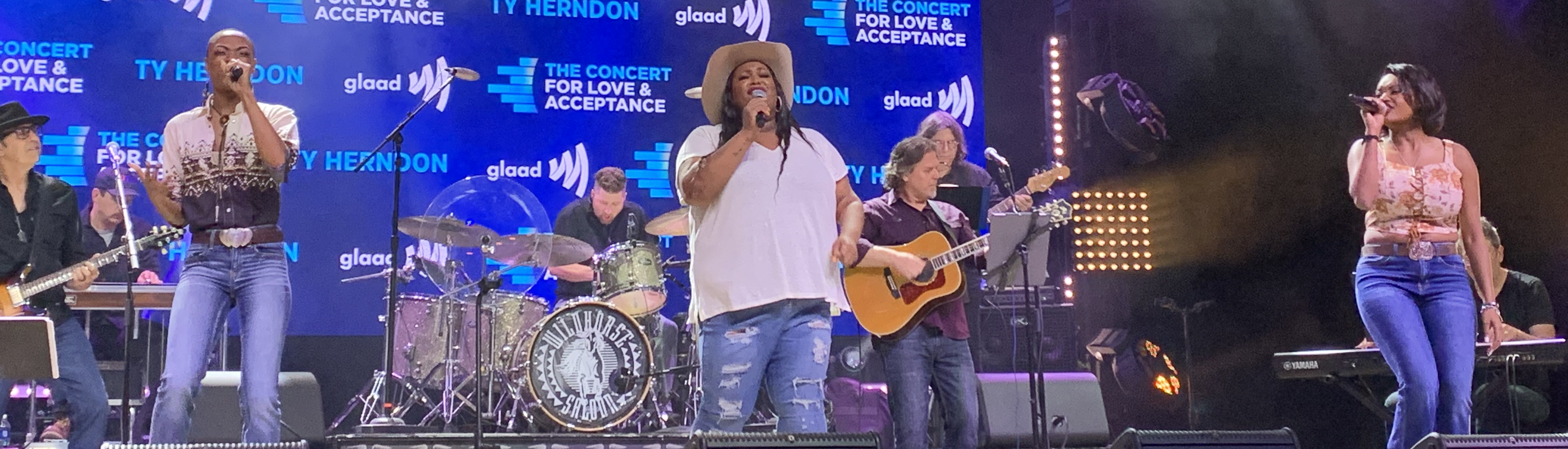
- Chapel Hart performing at the Wildhorse Saloon on June 7, 2023 (L-R: Trea Swindle, Danica Hart, Devynn Hart)

Background information
- Also known as: Hyperphlyy
- Origin: Poplarville, Mississippi, U.S.
- Genres: Country
- Years active: 2014–2025
- Labels: JT3D, Origins
- Spinoffs: Magnolia Rising
- Past members: Danica Hart; Devynn Hart; Trea Swindle
- Website: chapelhart.com

Chapel Hart, originally known as Hyperphlyy, was an American country music vocal group from Poplarville, Mississippi. The group consisted of sisters Danica Hart and Devynn Hart and their cousin Trea Swindle, all three of whom are vocalists. Chapel Hart has independently released four studio albums and eleven singles. In July 2022, they competed in the seventeenth season of America's Got Talent, where they finished fifth. Their performance of "You Can Have Him Jolene", an answer song to Dolly Parton's "Jolene", was the second time in the series' history that all four judges awarded a competitor the Golden Buzzer. The group's music is defined by their vocal harmony and influence from other female country acts. Chapel Hart disbanded in late 2025, with Danica continuing to perform as a solo artist, and the other two members forming a new duo called Magnolia Rising.

== Music career ==
Sisters Danica and Devynn Hart grew up in Poplarville, Mississippi. They began singing together in 2014 with their cousin Trea Swindle, busking by performing cover songs on the streets of New Orleans. Eventually, they began writing original songs as well. Danica Hart and Swindle recorded an extended play titled Made for Me in 2016 under the name Hyperphlyy. Then in 2019, they and Devynn released an album titled Out the Mud also under the name Hyperphlyy. The trio also performed at music festivals in Innsbruck, Austria, as well as Louisiana. They renamed themselves Chapel Hart, taking the name from a church in their hometown.

Chapel Hart performed tribute shows to female country acts at Scoreboard Bar & Grill in Nashville, Tennessee, but were initially unsuccessful in securing a recording contract. In 2020, they were discovered by record producer Jeff Glixman, who began serving as their manager and producer. The same year, they released a single titled "Jesus & Alcohol", which featured ZZ Top member Billy Gibbons on guitar; he also appeared in the song's music video, playing the role of a pastor. T. Graham Brown and Deborah Allen also make cameos in the video, which aired on CMT after its release. Additionally, Chapel Hart sang background vocals on LeRoux's album One of Those Days in 2020.

CMT selected Chapel Hart as one of several artists for the 2021 installment of their "Next Women of Country" campaign, an annual promotion of new and upcoming female country music artists. The same year, Chapel Hart released their next single, "I Will Follow". A music video was produced for the song, which aired on CMT, with Jackyl lead singer Jesse James Dupree making a cameo appearance in it. Jennifer Hanson wrote the song with Savannah Keyes and Nick Brophy, the latter of whom co-produced it with Glixman. The corresponding music video began airing on CMT on February 5, 2021. Kevin John Coyne of Country Universe rated the song "A", praising the group members' singing voices while comparing the arrangement favorably to the works of SHeDAISY and the Chicks. A third single and video, "You Can Have Him Jolene", followed in March 2021. The song was inspired by Dolly Parton's "Jolene".

In July 2021, the group announced a second studio album, titled The Girls Are Back in Town. "I Will Follow" and "You Can Have Him Jolene" both appeared on the album. Glixman also produced this album. Lorie Hollabaugh of MusicRow stated of the album, "Every song on the 12-track project centers around the universal theme of celebrating and empowering women in country music while reminding listeners that love, harmony, diversity, and unity can co-exist in our present world." Another single and video, "Made for Me", followed in 2022.

=== America's Got Talent appearance and afterward ===
Chapel Hart had planned to tour with the Indigo Girls in mid-2022, but canceled this tour when one of the members of the duo was diagnosed with COVID-19. During this time, a producer for the NBC talent show America's Got Talent named Lindsay Rush contacted members of the group. According to Taste of Country, the group initially turned down her offer, but changed their minds after Rush contacted them several more times. On the audition episode airing July 19 (during the show's 17th season), they performed "You Can Have Him Jolene". All four judges awarded the group the Golden Buzzer, the second time in the show's history that this was done. Doing so allowed Chapel Hart to advance immediately to the next round of competition, eventually earning a spot in the finals after performing their original song "The Girls Are Back in Town". Chapel Hart advanced to the finals, where they performed a cover of Bonnie Raitt's "Something to Talk About" with Darius Rucker. They were eliminated from the fifth-place position after performing another original song, "American Pride".

Chapel Hart received an invitation to make their debut on the Grand Ole Opry on September 17, 2022. They were also featured on Darius Rucker's late-2022 single "Ol' Church Hymn". In late October 2022, Danica Hart underwent vocal cord surgery, requiring a period of vocal rest. Once Danica recovered, the trio released a new single titled "Glory Days" in January 2023, which they co-wrote with Jim Beavers. In a multi-person review from Country Universe, Jonathan Keefe and Zackary Kephart both spoke favorably of the song's story about struggling musicians and praised the vocal harmony, comparing the song's sound favorably to country music of the 1990s, while Coyne was less favorable towards the lyrics and lead vocal.

Another single for the group in 2023 was "Welcome to Fist City", an answer song to Loretta Lynn's 1968 single "Fist City". Prior to her death in 2022, Lynn had asked the trio to write the song. Chapel Hart also announced a series of tour dates for 2023. "Welcome to Fist City" and "Glory Days" were included on the group's third studio album also titled Glory Days, released in May 2023. The trio promoted the album through a concert tour, including a performance at the CMA Music Festival. Holly Smith of the website Holler Country praised the album's vocal harmonies and called the album "jubilant".

Chapel Hart returned to the America's Got Talent spin-off America's Got Talent: Fantasy League in January 2024, where they performed "American Pride". This performance coincided the release of a new single titled "2033". In 2024, the group signed to Origins Records to release their first Christmas album, Hartfelt Family Christmas. The album includes collaborations with Darius Rucker, the Isaacs, Vince Gill, and T. Graham Brown. The trio made their debut in California during the 2025 Rose Parade, and made an appearance at Jazz Fest in New Orleans on April 25. The trio also released a new single in January 2025 titled "Perfect for Me". Four months later, they collaborated with a cappella group Home Free to do a cover of Beyoncé's "Texas Hold 'Em".

=== 2025–2026: Breakup and Danica Hart solo career ===
According to the Hattiesburg American, Danica posted on Facebook in July 2025 that she no longer felt comfortable in the group due to unspecified allegations of abuse toward her, and was considering leaving. She later deleted the Facebook post after receiving death threats, and stated that she would continue with the group. Despite this initial confirmation, the group announced on all of their social media accounts one month later that they would be breaking up. They also confirmed that Danica would be continuing as a solo artist, while Devynn and Swindle would form a new duo called Magnolia Rising. Magnolia Rising released their debut single "Hit the Ground" in November 2025. Meanwhile, Danica Hart began touring as a solo act in 2026. Her first tour dates include a number of solo acoustic performances called the Open Hart Sessions, held mostly at venues in Mississippi.

== Musical influences and style ==
In 2020, Danica told the Houston Chronicle that she was influenced by albums from George Strait and Kenny Rogers. She and Devynn have also cited Gretchen Wilson as a primary musical influence. Joey Guerra of the Houston Chronicle noted that Chapel Hart's sound is heavily reliant on their use of vocal harmony. He also found Danica's voice comparable to that of Etta James, while also finding influences of a "classic girl group" sound on other songs. Later in 2020, Swindle told American Songwriter that she was aware of the unusual choice for an African American act to record country music, telling the publication: "You don't really choose [country music]. It was how we grew up and who we are." Jessica Nicholson of Billboard wrote of the group's style that it "blends tightly-woven, family harmonies with straight-from-the-heart lyrics". Devynn also said that the positive reception from their America's Got Talent performance of "You Can Have Him Jolene", which all three members of the trio wrote, inspired the trio to write more songs on Glory Days. AllMusic writer Stephen Thomas Erlewine describes Chapel Hart as "a spirited country music harmony group" and "steeped in tradition but ha[ving] a smart, knowing modern sensibility".

== Discography ==
Chapel Hart discography
- Studio albums: 4
- EPs: 1
- Singles: 11
- Music videos: 6

=== Studio albums ===
List of studio albums, showing other relevant details
Title	Album details
Out the Mud (Note: Out the Mud was originally released on July 16, 2019, under the group's previous name of Hyperphlyy. The album was re-released on August 2, 2019, credited to Chapel Hart.)	Released: July 16, 2019; Label: JT3D
The Girls Are Back in Town	Released: August 28, 2021; Label: JT3D
Glory Days	Released: May 19, 2023; Label: JT3D
Hartfelt Family Christmas	Released: October 25, 2024; Label: Origins

=== Extended plays ===
List of extended plays, showing other relevant details
Title	Album details
Made for Me (Note: Made for Me was released under the band's previous name, Hyperphlyy, and features only Devyn Hart and Trea Swindle.)	Released: September 20, 2016; Label: Fatboi Music, LLC

=== Singles ===
Single	Year	Peak chart positions	Album
Single	Year	US Country Digital	Album
"Just Say I Love You"	2019	—	The Girls Are Back in Town
"Jesus & Alcohol"	2020	—	The Girls Are Back in Town
"I Will Follow"	2021	—	The Girls Are Back in Town
"You Can Have Him Jolene"	2021	4	The Girls Are Back in Town
"Grown Ass Woman" (Mickie James with Chapel Hart)	2021	—	The Girls Are Back in Town
"The Girls Are Back in Town"	2021	21	The Girls Are Back in Town
"Made for Me"	2022	—	—N/a
"Ol' Church Hymn" (Darius Rucker with Chapel Hart)	2022	—	Carolyn's Boy
"Glory Days"	2023	—	Glory Days
"Welcome to Fist City"	2023	—	Glory Days
"2033"	2024	—	—N/a
"Perfect for Me"	2025	—	—N/a

=== Music videos ===
List of music videos, showing other relevant details
Title	Year	Director
"Whenever Forever"	2020	—N/a
"Country Paradise"	2020	—N/a
"Jesus & Alcohol"	2020	David Abbott
"I Will Follow"	2021	Nick Barrett Media
"You Can Have Him Jolene"	2021	David Abbott
"Made for Me"	2022	Edward Miller
