= Ron Sharpe (businessman) =

Australian businessman (1950–2121)

Ron Sharpe OAM
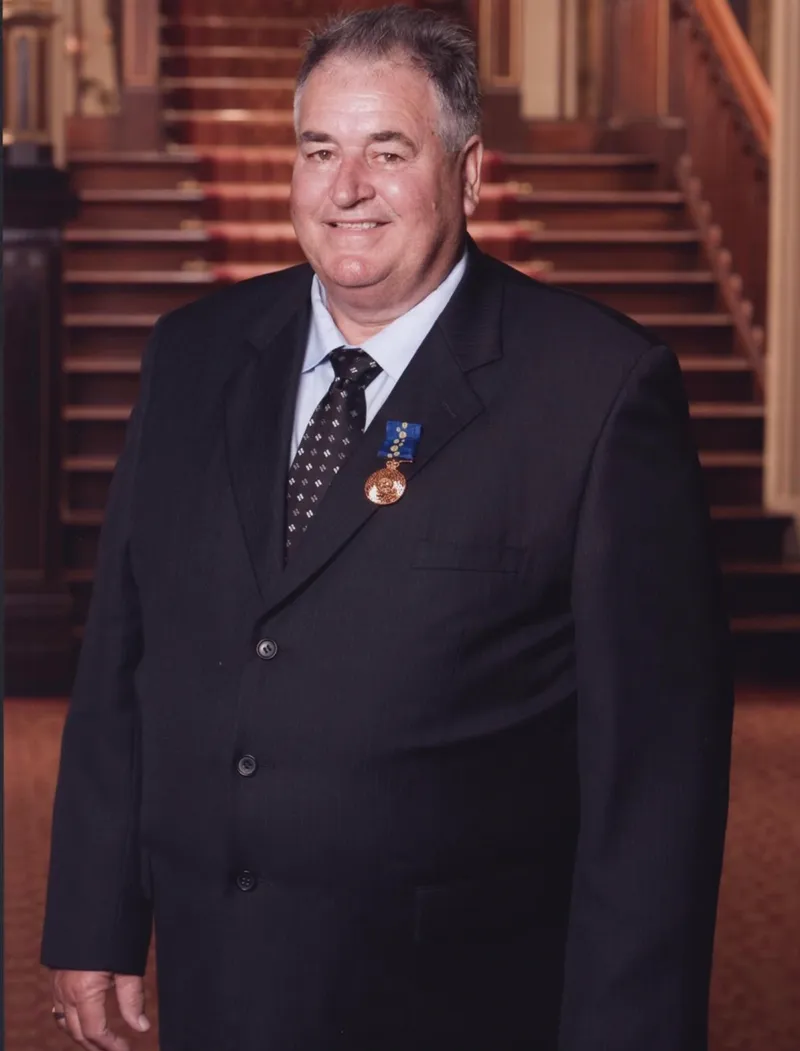
- Born: Ronald Douglas Sharpe; 27 June 1950; Sydney
- Died: 26 June 2021 (aged 70); Gosford, Australia
- Resting place: Palmdale Cemetery and Crematorium
- Occupations: businessman; carpenter; builder; mechanic; volunteer; community leader

Ronald Sharpe (27 June 1950 – 26 June 2021) was a civil engineer and director, known for his support of community work in the central coast area of Australia.

== Life and career ==
Sharpe was a joint managing director of Industrial Holdings Pty Ltd. He was a former Chairman of the NSW Branch of the Order of Australia Association. Sharpe was a carpenter, a licensed commercial builder, a licensed mechanic and built a career in the field of civil engineering. Throughout his life he was involved in civil infrastructure and road maintenance through the Sharpe family business. Ron Sharpe was the Founding Chairman of the Road Profiling Association of Australia, which evolved to become a part of the Australian Asphalt Pavement Association. As part of the celebration of AAPA's 40th anniversary in 2009, he was recognised for his services to the industry.

In November 2009, a book by Margaret Hardy titled Significant Men of the Central Coast was launched and included Ron Sharpe and his sons; who were mentioned for their involvement in providing support to community groups through donations, partnerships, volunteering and community sponsorships.

Sharpe was a member of the Umina Apex Club and was awarded Life Membership in 1990. He helped raise funds for a number of causes including the Surf Rescue Helicopter and the Royal Volunteer Coastal Patrol. He was involved with the Salvation Army throughout his life, being a member of the Salvation Army Band, building the Salvation Army Hall at Umina with his father and being chairperson for the Peninsula Red Shield Appeal.

Ron Sharpe was a chairman and regional coordinator of the New South Wales State Committee of the Order of Australia Association.

== Honours ==
In January 2005, Sharpe was named Citizen of the Year for the City of Gosford and on Australia Day 2006, he was awarded an Order of Australia (OAM) in recognition of his service to the community of the Gosford region through a range of service and social welfare organisations.

== Letter of condolence from the governor-general of Australia ==
Upon Sharpe's death, David Hurly, the Governor-General of Australia, released a letter of condolence.
