= Sharpe Family Singers =

American family musical group

- Origin: Basking Ridge, New Jersey, U.S.
- Genres: Theatrical pop; Pop; A capella
- Years active: 2014–present
- Members: Ronald Sharpe; Barbra Russell-Sharpe; Samantha Ellen Sharpe; Logan Henry Sharpe; Aidan Joseph Sharpe; Connor Vincent Sharpe
- Website: sharpefamilysingers.com

Instagram information
- Page: Sharpe Family Singers
- Followers: 624 thousand

TikTok information
- Page: Sharpe Family Singers
- Followers: 9.7 million

YouTube information
- Channels: Sharpe Family Singers; Sharpe Talk Pod!
- Genres: Music, Vlogs, Podcasts
- Subscribers: 2.77 million
- Views: 2.33 billion
- Last updated: 22 September 2026

The Sharpe Family Singers are an American family musical group from Basking Ridge, New Jersey. The group has been described as a contemporary version of The Partridge Family and has built a significant presence on social media, with over 2.78 million subscribers on YouTube and 9.7 million followers on TikTok. The group consists of parents Ron and Barbra Sharpe, along with their children Logan, Samantha, Aidan, and Connor.

Ron and Barbra Sharpe both have backgrounds in musical theater, having met while starring in the Broadway production of "Les Misérables".

The Sharpe Family Singers initially gained attention through live performances, later expanding their audience through social media, where they regularly post both short and long-form content.

The Sharpe Family Singers have a main musical YouTube channel under the same name, along with a second channel for podcasts, vlogs, and other non-musical content. The second channel, formerly known as "Sharpe Family Vlogs!", was rebranded as "Sharpe Talk Pod!" in September 2026 following the launch of the family's podcast of the same name.

== History ==
Ron and Barbra Sharpe first met when performing in a Broadway production of Les Misérables, where they played the roles of Marius and Cosette, respectively. After becoming married on stage over 1000 times, Ron and Barbra decided to get married in real life. They have four children together, Samantha, Logan, and identical twins Aidan and Connor.

Apart from performing, Ron and Barbra have also produced two Broadway shows, A Catered Affair, and A Tale of Two Cities.

Samantha auditioned for the nineteenth season of American Idol in 2021, and was later eliminated in the Hollywood Round. The whole family also sang an arrangement of "Into The Unknown" at her audition.

The Sharpe Family Singers started their professional musical journey in 2014 and toured globally, performing a combination of popular songs and theatrical music. Their show Married to Broadway, performed seasonally, launched in 2014 and originally featured Ron and Barbra Sharpe along with their friend Natalie Toro. The show has since expanded to include their children as well as other friends and members of the Sharpes' extended family.

The Sharpe Family Singers were forced to stop touring when the COVID-19 pandemic hit, and turned to social media, where they earned millions of views on TikTok, as well as a guest appearance on the Tamron Hall Show and other various local news outlets.

Since then, the Sharpe Family Singers have gained 2.78 million subscribers and 2.32 billion views on YouTube, as well as 9.7 million followers on TikTok. The Sharpe Family Singers have since been invited to sing the national anthem at sports games, and have also performed three times in the 6abc Dunkin' Donuts Thanksgiving Day Parade, and competed in America's Got Talent in 2023.

In May 2025, their children Samantha, Logan, Aidan, and Connor formed a musical group The Sharpes, marking a transition from performing as part of the family group to establishing their own act.

== Notable Performances ==
=== America's Got Talent ===
The Sharpe Family Singers entered the eighteenth season of America's Got Talent in 2023. During their audition, they performed an original arrangement of "How Far I'll Go" from the film Moana, receiving four "yes" votes from the judges. However, they were eliminated in Qualifiers 2 after performing an original arrangement of "Carry On Wayward Son" by Kansas, which received a buzz from Howie Mandel.

=== 6abc Dunkin' Thanksgiving Day Parade ===
The Sharpe Family Singers have been invited to perform at the 6abc Dunkin' Thanksgiving Day Parade three times. In 2021, they performed "Fa La La HO HO HO", an original Christmas song from their Christmas Album. In 2023, the Sharpe Family Singers performed twice during the parade: first at the beginning of the parade with "Go the Distance" from Disney's Hercules, and later at the end with "It's Beginning to Look a Lot Like Christmas" from their Christmas Album. In 2024, they performed twice again: first with "Christmas Time is Here", an original Christmas song from their Christmas Album, and later with "Into The Unknown" from Disney's Frozen 2.

== Discography ==
=== Singles ===
#	Song	Songwriter(s)	Year
1	"Hope You Find Lovin'"	Brandon John Bichajian; Donald Philp; Sean Feth	2024
2	"BTW" (Note: The single "BTW" was released under the name "The Sharpes", a group consisting solely of the children in the Sharpe Family Singers: Samantha, Logan, Aidan, and Connor.)	Brandon John Bichajian; Donald Philp; Rose Marie; Sean Feth	2025
3	"Sun Soaked Christmas"	Brandon John Bichajian; Donald Philp; Sean Feth	2025
4	"High School Sweetheart"	Aidan Sharpe; Connor Sharpe; Brandon John; Bichajian; Rose Marie; Donald Philp; Sean Feth	2026
5	"Home In Every Heart"	Kasun Primaal Fernando; Barbra Sharpe	2026

=== A Sharpe Family Christmas (Album) ===
#	Song	Songwriter(s)	Year
1	"Fa La La HO HO HO"	Jim Brickman; Arun Chaturvedi; Luke McMaster	2021
2	"The Christmas Song"	Robert Wells; Mel Tormé	2021
3	"Awaken The Spirit Of Christmas"	Edward B. Kessel; Sandy Linzer	2021
4	"It's Beginning to Look a Lot Like Christmas"	Meredith Willson	2021
5	"I Saw Mommy Kissing Santa Claus"	Tommie Connor	2021
6	"I'll Be Home for Christmas"	Walter Kent; Kim Gannon; Buck Ram	2021
7	"Christmas Time Is Here"	David Rosenthal; James Fox; Mads Hauge	2021
8	"Once Upon a December"	Lynn Ahrens; Stephen Flaherty	2021
9	"Rockin' Around the Christmas Tree"	Johnny Marks	2021
10	"Silent Night"	Traditional	2021
11	"Jingle Bell Rock"	Jim Boothe; Joe Beal	2021
12	"Breath of Heaven"	Amy Grant; Chris Eaton	2021
