= The Mayyas =

Lebanese precision dance group

General information
- Name: The Mayyas
- Founder: Nadim Cherfan

Artistic staff
- Resident choreographers: Nadim Cherfan

The Mayyas (Arabic: مَيّاس) are a Lebanese all-female alternative precision dance group. The company has 36 dancers, and their routines are choreographed by Nadim Cherfan. The group's name means "the proud walk of a lioness" in Arabic.

In 2019, the Mayyas reached the semifinals of Britain's Got Talent: The Champions and took first place in Arabs Got Talent. They won season 17 of America's Got Talent in 2022. The Mayyas also received judge Sofía Vergara's Golden Buzzer of the contest.

Following the group's America's Got Talent win, they were praised on Twitter by Lebanese celebrities, as well as former caretaker prime minister Najib Mikati, and the Lebanese army command. Former president of the Republic General Michel Aoun congratulated the group on their victory, saying they had "planted hope and light in all of our hearts". He also awarded them the Lebanese Order of Merit "in appreciation of the troupe's artistic performances and success".

The Mayyas performed alongside American singer Beyoncé at the opening of the Atlantis The Royal Dubai hotel in the United Arab Emirates. They performed with the singer for a second time in Paris at Stade de France during her 2025 Cowboy Carter Tour.

== Awards ==
Year	Award	Result
2019	Arabs Got Talent	Won
2022	America's Got Talent	Won

== See also ==
- Middle Eastern dance
