= Got Talent =

Television talent show franchise

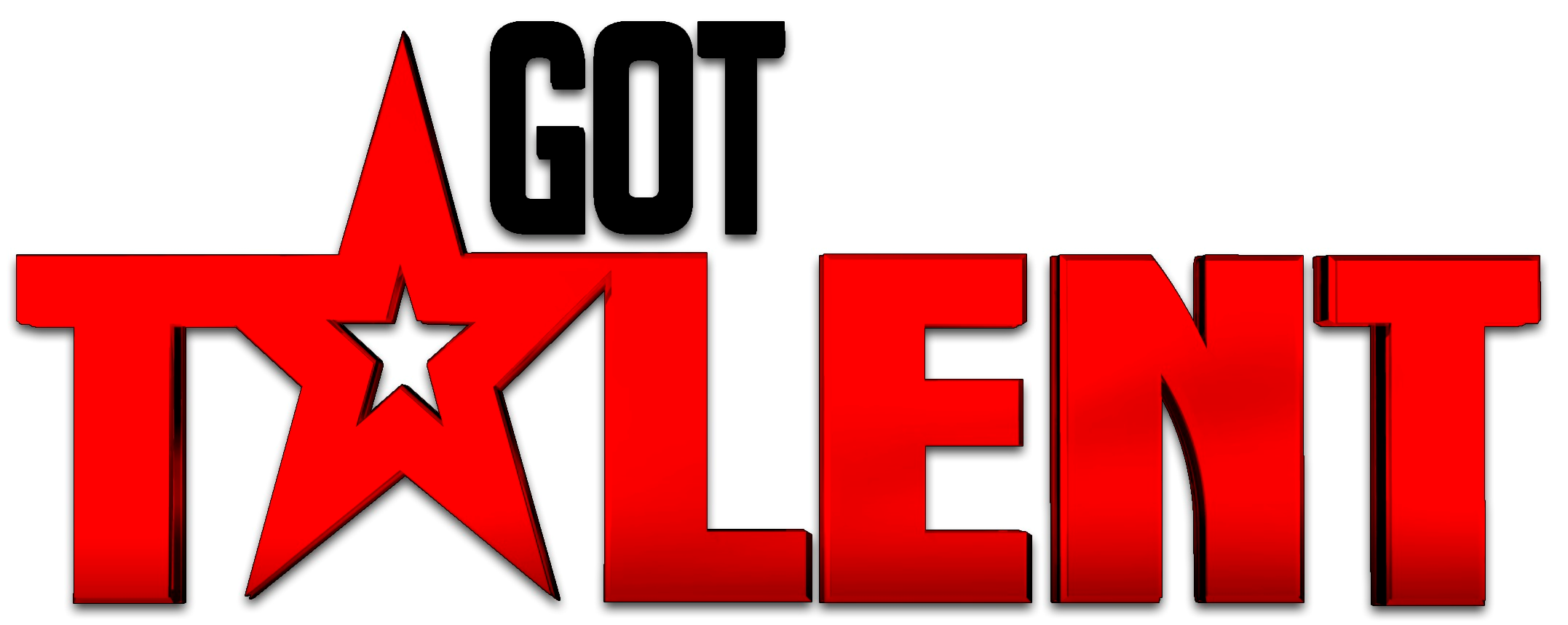
- Created by: Simon Cowell
- Original work: Britain's Got Talent; Australia's Got Talent; America's Got Talent (first broadcast)
- Owner: Syco Entertainment
- Years: 2006–present

Films and television
- Television series: Got Talent (see international versions); Got Talent Kids; Got More Talent; Planet's/World's Got Talent; The Champions

Miscellaneous
- Genre: Talent show
- First aired: 21 June 2006; 20 years ago
- Distributor: Fremantle

Official website
- Production website

Got Talent is a British (Note: The format is labelled as "British" because although America had the first full season of the format, Britain's Got Talent had its pilot episode conceived and filmed in the first few months of 2006 before America's Got Talent had begun production.) talent show TV format conceived and owned by Simon Cowell's Syco Entertainment. It has spawned spin-offs in over 60 countries, in what is now referred to as the 'Got Talent' format, similar to that described by Fremantle of the Idol and The X Factor formats. Unlike those shows, Got Talent (influenced by the variety of talent shows Opportunity Knocks and New Faces) showcases other artistic disciplines as well as singers.

In April 2014, the format was named the world's most successful reality TV format ever by Guinness World Records. Cowell said: "I am very proud that Got Talent is a homegrown British show. We owe its success to a group of very talented producers all over the world who have made this happen. And of course amazing talent."

== History ==
Got Talent was conceived in 2005 by Simon Cowell, creator and judge on The X Factor. The format's origins can be traced to the British talent shows Opportunity Knocks (on-screen from the 1950s, with the winner using the now-standard method of a telephone vote) and New Faces. Both shows showcased singers, dancers and comedians, as well as performers such as acrobats, animal acts and novelty acts. Cowell said:"I was a fan of variety shows Opportunity Knocks and New Faces, and to be able to update that tradition, really was a buzz".

The concept of the format was for a large-scale televised talent competition where anyone, of any age and background, could participate with any form of talent before an audience and a panel of judges. The concept was first proposed to the British television network ITV, which agreed to a pilot episode of the format. When it proved a success, work began on producing a series of the competition for British television, but was suspended after its intended host had a dispute with ITV and ultimately ended their involvement. Cowell subsequently promoted the concept to American television networks sooner than planned, and secured the interest of American television network NBC to produce a season for their 2006 summer broadcast schedule.

America's Got Talent debuted on 21 June 2006, and was the first international edition of the franchise to be produced and broadcast. The programme proved a success for NBC, who commissioned further seasons, while launching the franchise internationally – among countries where television networks between late 2006 bought up the competition's format to mid-2007 included France, Russia, Sweden, and Australia. Cowell later returned to the UK to continue production of the British edition for ITV, leading to Britain's Got Talent debuting on 9 June 2007.

=== Golden buzzer ===
The golden buzzer, which allows each judge to select one act to advance directly to the next round of the competition, was first introduced in 2012 on the sixth season of Germany's Das Supertalent, and was adopted in 2014 on both the eighth series of Britain's Got Talent and the ninth season of America's Got Talent.

Changes in the golden buzzer rules over the years have included allowing the host to award a golden buzzer separately from the judging panel; a "group" golden buzzer whereby the judges and the host can collectively give a golden buzzer to an act without losing their own personal golden buzzers; and an "audience" golden buzzer under which the panel can award a golden buzzer to an act that has generated an especially strong positive reaction from the studio audience.

In 2024, the fourth season of Canada's Got Talent introduced a $25,000 cash prize for each recipient of the golden buzzer, making it the first edition of the franchise to do so. In the same year, the nineteenth season of America's Got Talent introduced a change whereby each judge will be able to give two golden buzzers rather than one.

Not all versions of the franchise use the golden buzzer.

=== Proposed global version ===
In June 2010, following Britain's Got Talent's success at the BAFTA television awards, Cowell voiced his ideas regarding World's Got Talent, a global version of Got Talent. However, he argued that the format would not work with judges as they had all "tried to be him" in previous attempts (such as World Idol), and instead proposed a commentary format, similar to that of the Eurovision Song Contest. During the same week, more details were announced, with Cowell explaining 20 previous winning contestants from global variations of Got Talent would be brought together at the Royal Albert Hall with himself and Jonathan Lopez both having roles in the show. A proposed prize of £1 million was announced a projected global television audience of 300 million, and the intended airdate of 2011.

However, Cowell halted plans for the series because it would conflict with his judging commitments with The X Factor USA and Britain's Got Talent for the years to come. In February 2014, The X Factor USA was cancelled by Fox due to low ratings and Cowell's decision to return to the UK version of that show.

In 2014, ITV first broadcast a series of spin-off shows Planet's Got Talent which showed clips of Got Talent from all over the world. It was later broadcast in Italy on TV8 and Sky Uno. Slovenia made a show as same as the British one. In 2019, Hunan Television produced an unofficial spin-off series, World's Got Talent, whose copyrights were shared by Hunan Television and Fremantle, featuring 61 notable acts from the Got Talent franchise around the world. Currently, a similar version of "World's Got Talent" and "Planet's Got Talent" acts as a YouTube channel, known as "Got Talent Global". The channel uploads clips from "Got Talent" shows worldwide. The channel currently has over 21 million subscribers. A similar channel, called Top Talent uploads clips of The X Factor, Got Talent and Idol from around the world. That channel has over 6 million subscribers.

NBC launched a spin-off series, America's Got Talent: The Champions in 2019, featuring notable contestants from America's Got Talent alongside acts from the franchises worldwide. The winner of this spin-off series was Canadian-American card magician Shin Lim. In addition, Hunan Television produced an unofficial global version of Got Talent in 2019, the World's Got Talent presented by Eliza Liang and Wong Cho-lam, featuring notable contestants from the Got Talent versions around the world. Following the success of America's Got Talent: The Champions, ITV launched a spin-off series, Britain's Got Talent: The Champions in 2019, featuring notable contestants from Britain's Got Talent alongside acts from the franchises worldwide. The winner of this spin-off series was dance act, Twist and Pulse. In 2020, Seven Network launched a spinoff series of Australia's Got Talent called Australia's Got Talent: Challengers & Champions, which was cancelled before production began.

== Got Talent around the world ==
Legend:

Franchise with a currently airing season
Franchise with an upcoming season
Franchise with an unknown status
Franchise that was cancelled during production
Franchise that has ended
Franchise that was different but released in the format

=== Main series ===
Country/region	Local name	Network	Premiere	Host(s)	Judges	Seasons and winners
Africa	L'Afrique a un Incroyable Talent	RTI; ORTB; ORTM	14 October 2016	Konnie Touré; Daouda Sane	Claudia Tagbo; Fally Ipupa; Angélique Kidjo	Season 1, 2016: Two Brothers Sylla (acrobats); Season 2, 2017: Strauss Serpent (21-year-old contortionist)
Albania; Kosovo	Albanians Got Talent	Top Channel	25 August 2010	Albana Osmani; Benet Kaci	Altin Basha; Rovena Dilo; Armend Rexhepagiqi	Season 1, 2010: Fiqiri Luli & Sabrina Troushku (circus dancers)
Albania; Kosovo	Albania's Got Talent	Vizion Plus	11 November 2024	Isli Islami	Current; Adelina Ismaili; Kastro Zizo; Elsa Lila (2–); TBA (3–); Former; Ledina Çelo (1–2); Agron Llakaj (1–2)	Season 1, 2024–25: Tristan Cela (14-year-old singer); Season 2, 2025–26: Nikolas Bushi (performing); Season 3, 2026–27: Upcoming season
Arab world	Arabs Got Talent	MBC	14 January 2011	Current; Raya Abirached; Former; Qusai Kheder (1–6)	Current; Ali Jaber; Najwa Karam; Nasser Al Qasabi (2–4, 7–); Bassem Youssef (7–); Former; Amr Adeeb (1); Ahmed Helmy (3–6)	Season 1, 2011: Amr Qatamesh (stand-up satirical poetry); Season 2, 2012: Khawater Al-Zalam (glow-in-the-dark); Season 3, 2013: Sima group (artistic dance); Season 4, 2014–15: Salah Benlemqawanssa (35-year-old popper/b-boy); Season 5, 2017: Emanne Beasha (8-year-old opera singer); Season 6, 2019: Mayyas (mainly female dance troupe); Season 7, 2024: Mandalab (dance-troupe); Season 8, TBA: Awaiting confirmation
Argentina	Talento Argentino	Telefe	27 July 2008	Mariano Peluffo	Cesar 'Kike' Teruel; Maximiliano Guerra; Catherine Fulop	Season 1, 2008: Martin Bustos (25-year-old comedian/impersonator); Season 2, 2009: Daniel Ferreyra (39-year-old guitarist); Season 3, 2010–11: Diego Gutierrez (23-year-old button accordion player)
Argentina	Got Talent Argentina	Telefe	21 August 2023	Lizy Tagliani	Abel Pintos; Emir Abdul; Florencia Peña; La Joaqui	Season 1, 2023: Matías and Johanna Ortíz (dancers)
Armenia	Թաքնված տաղանդ Taqnvats taghand	Shant TV	2009	Grigor Aghakhanyan	Violet Grigoryan; Sergei Danielian; Nikolai Tsaturyan (1)^{†} Artyom Yerkanyan (2)	Season 1, 2009: Samvel Davtyan (singer); Season 2, 2010: Samvel Harutyunyan (singer)
Armenia	Got Talent Հայաստան	Shant TV	8 March 2026	Vahe Ziroyan; Gohar Gasparyan	Tigran Gyulumyan; Vika Martirosyan; André; Sona Sarkisyan	Season 1, 2026: Tigran Mkrtchyan (14-year-old musician)
Asia (Note: Joint version with India, Indonesia, Malaysia, Philippines, Singapore, Thailand, Vietnam and other more Asian countries, taking part)	Asia's Got Talent	AXN Asia	12 March 2015	Marc Nelson (1); Rovilson Fernandez (1); Alan Wong (2–3); Justin Bratton (2–3)	David Foster; Anggun; Melanie C (1); Vanness Wu (1); Jay Park (2–3)	Season 1, 2015: El Gamma Penumbra (shadow play group); Season 2, 2017: The Sacred Riana (25-year-old spooky magician); Season 3, 2019: Eric Chien (26-year-old close-up magician)
Australia	Australia's Got Talent	Seven Network (1–6, 9–10); Nine Network (7–8)	18 February 2007	Grant Denyer (1–6); Julia Morris (7); Dave Hughes (8); Ricki-Lee Coulter (9–10)	Red Symons (1–3); Tom Burlinson (1–3); Dannii Minogue (1–6); Brian McFadden (4–6); Kyle Sandilands (4–7); Dawn French (7); Geri Halliwell (7); Timomatic (7); Ian Dickson (8); Sophie Monk (8); Kelly Osbourne (8); Eddie Perfect (8); Lucy Durack (9); Nicole Scherzinger (9); Manu Feildel (9); Shane Jacobson (9–10); Alesha Dixon (10); Kate Ritchie (10); David Walliams (10)	Season 1, 2007: Bonnie Anderson (12-year-old singer); Season 2, 2008: "Smokin" Joe Robinson (16-year-old guitarist); Season 3, 2009: Mark Vincent (15-year-old opera singer); Season 4, 2010: Justice Crew (dance troupe); Season 5, 2011: Jack Vidgen (14-year-old singer); Season 6, 2012: Andrew De Silva (37-year-old singer); Season 7, 2013: Uncle Jed (Funk/Soul/Jazz/Reggae band); Season 8, 2016: Fletcher Pilon (15-year-old singer); Season 9, 2019: Kristy Sellars (33-year-old pole dancer); Season 10, 2022: Acromazing (acrobatic group)
Azerbaijan	Özünü Tanıt; Ozunu Tanit	ATV	February 2015	Aygun Akif; Elgun Huseynov	Murad Dadaşov; Aygün Kazımova; ABD Malik	Season 1, 2015: Elkhan Mammadov (magician)
Belgium	Supertalent in Vlaanderen (in Dutch)	VIER	15 March 2007	Dré Steemans^{†} Ann Van Elsen	Paul Jambers; Martine Prenen^{†} Gert Verhulst	Season 1, 2007: Triple E (singing trio sisters)
Belgium	Belgium's Got Talent (in Dutch)	VTM	10 September 2012	Koen Wauters; Laura Tesoro (4–7)	Ray Cokes (1–3); Karen Damen (1–3); Rob Vanoudenhoven (1–3); Niels Destadsbader (3–5; studioshows, 6); An Lemmens (4–7); Dan Karaty (4–6); Stan Van Samang (4–6); Jens Dendoncker (auditions, 6); Bart Peeters (7); Ruth Beeckmans (7); Davy Parmentier (7)	Season 1, 2012: Karolien Goris (11-year-old singer); Season 2, 2013: Michael Lanzo (34-year-old singer); Season 3, 2015: Domenico Vaccaro (22-year-old pole dancer); Season 4, 2016: Baba Yega (dance troupe); Season 5, 2018: Tascha & Ian (dancers); Season 6, 2019: Benjamin Ceyssens (19-year-old pianist); Season 7, 2021: De Mini Droids (dance troupe)
Belgium	Belgium's Got Talent (in French)	RTL-TVI	10 September 2012	Julie Taton; Jean-Michel Zecca	Maureen Dor; Carlos Vaquera; Paul Ambach	Season 1, 2012: 2 Mad (dance troupe); Season 2, 2013: Junbox (20-year-old dancer)
Belgium & Netherlands	Got Talent	VTM; RTL 4	4 September 2026	Chantal Janzen; Koen Wauters	Dan Karaty; Karen Damen; Marc-Marie Huijbregts; Soundos El Ahmadi; James Cooke	Season 1, 2026: Current season
Brazil	Got Talent Brasil	Record (1); SBT (2–)	2 April 2013	Current; Ratinho (2–); Former; Rafael Cortez (1)	Current; TBA (2–); TBA (2–); TBA (2–); Former; Milton Cunha (1); Daniela Cicarelli (1); Sidney Magal (1)	Season 1, 2013: Domingues da Palha (45-year-old coconut leaf musician); Season 2, 2026: Upcoming season
Bulgaria	България търси талант Balgariya tarsi talant	bTV	1 March 2010	Maria Ignatova (1–2); Aleksandra Raeva (1–2); Maria Silvestar (3–5); Aleksandar Kadiev (4, 6–9); Daniel Petkanov (6–8); Petar Antonov (9)	Magarditch Halvadjian (1; auditions, 2); Hilda Kazasyan (1–2); Lyuben Dilov Jr. (1–3, 5–6; auditions, 7)^{†} Krasimir Radkov (live shows, 2); Asen Blatechki (3, 5); Vanya Tsvetkova (3); Esil Duran (3); Darina Pavlova (4); Ivo Siromahov (4); Nikolai Iliev (4); Iliana Benovska (auditions and semi-finals, 4); Desi Dobreva (semi-finals and final, 4); Mihaela Fileva (5); Itso Hazarta (5–7); Katerina Evro (6–9); Slavena Vatova (6–7); Lyubomir Neikov (live shows, 7); Nikolaos Tsitiridis (8–9); Evelyn Kostova (8); Todor Kantardzhiev (8); Galena (9); Julian Vergov (9)	Season 1, 2010: Bogdana Petrova (17-year-old visually impaired singer); Season 2, 2012: Kristina Arabadzhieva (12-year-old singer); Season 3, 2014: Thomas Tomov (17-year-old opera singer); Season 4, 2015: Plamen Lyubenov (20-year-old wheelchair breakdancer); Season 5, 2016: Vivo Montana (18–44-year-old musical band); Season 6, 2019: Adriyan Asenov (31-year-old blind imitator); Season 7, 2021: Kaloyan Geshev (10-year-old mental calculator); Season 8, 2022: Stefan Ivanov (6-year-old bagpiper); Season 9, 2025: Konstantin Chervenkov (10-year-old mental calculator)
Cambodia	Cambodia's Got Talent	Hang Meas HDTV	30 November 2014	Nhem Sokun (1); Pen Chamrong (1); Chea Vibol (2); San Visal (3)	Preap Sovath (1–2); Khat Sokhim; Neay Koy; Neay Krem (2–3); Chea Vibol (3)	Season 1, 2014–15: Yoeun Pisey (15-year-old blind singer); Season 2, 2018: The King (dance group); Season 3, 2023: MJM (dance group)
Canada	Canada's Got Talent (in English)	Citytv	4 March 2012	Lindsay Ell (2–5); Dina Pugliese (1)	Stephan Moccio (1); Measha Brueggergosman (1); Martin Short (1); Lilly Singh (2–4); Trish Stratus (2–4); Howie Mandel (2–5); Kardinal Offishall (2–5); Shania Twain (5); Katherine Ryan (5)	Season 1, 2012: Sagkeeng's Finest (tap dance troupe); Season 2, 2022: Jeanick Fournier (48-year-old singer); Season 3, 2023: Conversion (dance group); Season 4, 2024: Rebecca Strong (20-year-old singer); Season 5, 2025: Jacob Lewis (34-year-old singer)
Canada	Canadian Family's Got Talent	Citytv	27 April 2020	Dina Pugliese; Devo Brown	Simon Cowell	Season 1, 2020: CZN (singing trio)
Canada	Quel talent!(in French)	Noovo	9 September 2024	Marie-Josée Gauvin	Rachid Badouri; Anne Dorval; Marie-Mai; Serge Denoncourt	Season 1, 2024: Stardust (dance troupe); Season 2, 2025: Jerry Tremblay (comedian and acrobat)
Central Asia (Note: Joint version with Kazakhstan, Kyrgyzstan, Tajikistan, and Uzbekistan taking part)	Central Asia's Got Talent	Khabar (1); Kyrgyz Television; TV Safina; Zo'r TV (1); NTK (2); Sevimli TV (2); Xəzər TV (2)	15 September 2019	Bekhruz Nasriddinov (1); Kumar Lukmanov (1); Timur Aliyev (1); Yerkebulan Myrzabek (1); Erkin Ryskulbekov; Akkenzhe Alimzhan (2); Begzod Abdusamatov (2); Zarina Rahimi (2); Leyla Aliyeva (2)	Alovuddin Abdullayev (1)^{†} Gulnur Satylganova (1); Nurlan Abdullin (1); Sitora Farmonova; Serik Akishev (2); Yerbolat Zhanabylov (2)	Season 1, 2019: Chorshanbe Alovatov (22-year-old singer); Season 2, 2022: Moranbon (dance group)
Chile	Talento Chileno	Chilevisión	27 September 2010	Julián Elfenbein (1); Rafael Araneda (2–3); Eva Gómez (4–6)	Antonio Vodanovic; Rodrigo Díaz (1–3); Francisca García-Huidobro (1–3); Carolina de Moras (4–6); Bombo Fica (4–6)	Season 1, 2010: Camila Silva (16-year-old singer); Season 2, 2011: Ignacio Venegas (23-year-old singer); Season 3, 2012: Susana Sáez (35-year-old singer); Season 4, 2013: Carolina and Felipe (tango dancers); Season 5, 2014: Hugo Macaya (38-year-old blind singer); Season 6, 2015: Cristofer Mera (19-year-old singer) & Samsara (band)
Chile	Got Talent Chile	Mega	12 March 2021	María José Quintanilla; Karla Constant	Carolina Arregui; Sergio Freire; Luis Gnecco; Denise Rosenthal	Season 1, 2021: Juliana Ángel González (13-year-old singer)
China (Note: Includes the special administrative regions of Hong Kong and Macau)	中国达人秀; China's Got Talent pinyin: Zhōngguó Dárén Xiù lit: China Talent Show	DragonTV; Xing Kong	25 July 2010	Cao Kefan (1); Yang Lan (2); Cheng Lei (1–6)	Zhou Libo (1–3); Gao Xiaosong (1–4); Annie Yi (1–4); Chen Yiu-Chuen (2); Yang Lan (2); Huang Shu-chun (2–4); Ni Ping (3); Cui Yongyuan (3); Liu Wei (3); Huang Doudou (3–4); Dou Wentao (4); Xu Jinglei (4); Leon Lai Ming (4); Yang Wei (4); Ying Da (4); Zhao Wei (5); Liu Ye (5); Su You-peng (5); Wang Wei-chung (5); Yang Mi (6); Shen Teng (6); Jin Xing (6); Cai Guoqing (6); Yue Yunpeng (6)	Season 1, 2010: Liu Wei (23-year-old armless pianist); Season 2, 2011: Zhuo Jun (19-year-old popper); Season 3, 2011–12: Pan Qianqian (24-year-old female baritone singer); Season 4, 2012–13: Wang Jungru (17-year-old contortionist); Season 5, 2013–14: Yin Zhonghua (acrobat); Season 6, 2019: Shi Zheyuan (39-year-old drone performer)
China	点赞！达人秀; Talent pinyin: Diǎnzàn! Dárén Xiù lit: Thumbs Up! Talent Show	Jiangsu Television; Douyin	31 Oct 2021	Zhang Chunye	Meng Fei; Nicholas Tse; G.E.M. Annie Yi	Season 1, 2021: Zhu Qiaoyan (acrobat)
Colombia	Colombia Tiene Talento	Canal RCN	6 February 2012	Santiago Rodríguez; Eva Rey (2)	Paola Turbay; Alejandra Azcarate; Manolo Cardona (1); José Gaviria (2)	Season 1, 2012: Paolo Alexander González (24-year-old pianist); Season 2, 2013: Byron González (19-year-old speed painter)
Croatia; Bosnia and Herzegovina; Montenegro	Supertalent	Nova TV; Nova BH (6–); Nova M (6–)	25 September 2009	Rene Bitorajac (1–6); Igor Mešin; Frano Ridjan (7–)	Current; Martina Tomčić (4–); Maja Šuput (5–); Davor Bilman (5–); Fabijan Pavao Medvešek (9–); Former; Nina Badrić (1–3); Enis Bešlagić (1–3); Dubravko Merlić (1–3); Danijela Martinović (4); Mario Petreković (4); Mislav Čavajda (4); Janko Popović Volarić (5–8)	Season 1, 2009: Tihomir Bendelja (15-year-old gymnastics twirler); Season 2, 2010: Viktorija Novosel (21-year-old singer); Season 3, 2011: Promenada Klub (shadow theatre); Season 4, 2016: Petar Bruno Basić (23-year-old pole dancer); Season 5, 2017: Emil & Mateja (dancing duo); Season 6, 2018: Denis Barta (20-year-old blind and autistic singer); Season 7, 2019: Transform Crew (dancing troupe); Season 8, 2021: Anatacha Filimone (18-year-old singer); Season 9, 2022: Magic Leon (27-year-old illusionist); Season 10, 2023: Chritzel Renae Aceveda (12-year-old singer); Season 11, 2024: Tamia Šeme (25-year-old acrobat); Season 12, 2025: Duo Turkeev & Kids (acrobatic troupe); Season 13, 2026: Current season
Czech Republic & Slovakia	Česko Slovensko má talent	TV JOJ; JOJ Family (6–); TV Prima (1–5, 7–)	29 August 2010	Current; David Gránský (7–); Jasmina Alagič (9–); Former; Martin "Pyco" Rausch (1–4); Jakub Prachař (1–4); Marcel Forgáč (5–6); Milan Junior Zimnýkoval (5–6); Lujza Garajová-Schrameková (7–8)	Current; Jaro Slávik; Diana Mórová (5–); Jakub Prachař (5–); Marta Jandová (7–); Leoš Mareš (4, 12–); Former; Jan Kraus (1); Lucie Bílá (1–6); Martin Dejdar (2–3)	Season 1, 2010: DaeMen (hand-to-hand acrobatics); Season 2, 2011: Atai Omurzakov (21-year-old dancer); Season 3, 2012: Jozef Pavlusík (24-year-old opera singer); Season 4, 2013: Miroslav Sýkora (25-year-old opera singer); Season 5, 2015: Gyöngyi Bodišová (22-year-old singer); Season 6, 2016: Act 4 Slovakia (acrobatic on bicycles); Season 7, 2018: Nikoleta Šurinová (11-year-old drummer); Season 8, 2019: Margaréta Ondrejková (16-year-old singer); Season 9, 2021: Diamonds (dance group); Season 10, 2022: Nikola Kusendová (18-year-old singer); Season 11, 2023: Anna Slížová (24-year-old singer); Season 12, 2024: Silvia Vršková (47-year-old aerialist); Season 13, TBA: Awaiting confirmation
Denmark	Talent	DR1	15 August 2008	Mikkel Herforth (1); Felix Schmidt (1–3)	Martin Hall (1); Julie Steincke (1); Peter Aalbæk Jensen (1); Jesper Dahl (2–3); Hella Joof (2–3); Nikolaj Koppel (2–3)	Season 1, 2008: Robot Boys (robot dancing duo); Season 2, 2009: Kalle Pimp (23-year-old rapper); Season 3, 2010: Copenhagen Drummers (military drummers)
Denmark	Danmark Har Talent	TV2	2014	Christopher Læssø (1–4); Felix Schmidt (1–4); Rasmus Brohave (5); Cecilie Haugaard (5)	Jarl Friis-Mikkelsen (1–4); Cecilie Lassen (1–4); Peter Frödin (1–5); TopGunn (1); Nabiha (2–3); Thomas Buttenschøn (4); Signe Lindkvist (5); Simon Jul (5); Sus Wilkins (5)	Season 1, 2014–15: Thor Mikkelsen (17-year-old beatboxer); Season 2, 2015–16: Matias Rasmussen (23-year-old Rubik's Cube solver); Season 3, 2017: Johanne Astrid (10-year-old Drummer); Season 4, 2018: Moonlight Brothers (brothers dance duo); Season 5, 2019: Alex Porsing (24-year-old FMX rider)
Dominican Republic	Dominicana's Got Talent	Color Visión	4 September 2019	Current; Enrique Quailey (3–); Lorenna Pierre (3–); Former; Frank Perozo (1); Pamela Sued (1); Francisco Vásquez (2); Karina Larrauri (2)	Current; Nashla Bogaert; Waddys Jaquez; Pamela Sued (2–); Irving Alberti (3–); Former; Raymond Pozo (1–2); Milagros Germán (1)	Season 1, 2019: Francis 'Babyrotty' Campusano (13-year-old singer); Season 2, 2020–21: Keren Montero (14-year-old singer); Season 3, 2025–26: Da Republik Junior (dance group)
East Africa	East Africa's Got Talent	Citizen TV; Clouds Media; RTV; NBS TV	4 August 2019	Anne Kansiime	Gaetano Kagwa; Vanessa Mdee; Makeda; Jeff Koinange	Season 1, 2019: Esther and Ezekiel (brother-and-sister singing duo)
Ecuador	Ecuador Tiene Talento	Ecuavisa	25 March 2012	Nicolas Espinoza (1); Bianca Salame (1); Henry Bustamante (2); Jonathan Estrada (2–6)	Diego Spotorno (1–2); Karla Kanora (1); Jaime Enrique Aymara (1); Maria Fernanda Rios (2–4); Wendy Vera (2–5 (auditions); Paola Farias (2–5); Fabrizio Ferretti (3); Fernando Villarroel (4–5); Carolina Jaume (5); Francisco Pinoargotti (5 (semi-finals onwards); Lila Flores (6); Ángelo Barahona (6); Carolina Aguirre (6); Martín Guerrero (6)	Season 1, 2012: Luis Castillo (37-year-old street comedian); Season 2, 2013: José Fernando Lara (26-year-old singer); Season 3, 2014: Ledesma Brothers (foldclore singers); Season 4, 2015: Christian Loaiza (30-year-old singer); Season 5, 2016: CAN Group (Talented police dogs); Season 6, 2017: Juventud Bolivarense (young music trio)
Estonia	Eesti talent	TV3	9 October 2010	Eda-Ines Etti; Tanel Padar	Kristiina Heinmets-Aigro; Valdo Randpere; Mihkel Raud	Season 1, 2010–11: Erki-Andres Nuut (21-year-old leaf instrument player)
Finland	Talent Suomi	Nelonen (1–5); MTV3 (6–7)	1 October 2007	Susanna Laine (1); Martti Vannas (1); Jarkko Valtee (2–3); Osku Heiskanen (2–3); Lorenz Backman (4); Sebastian Rejman (4); Heikki Paasonen (5); Elina Kottonen (5); Mikko Leppilampi (6–7)	Timo Koivusalo (1); Sami Saikkonen (1–3); Katja Ståhl (1–3); Jaana Saarinen (2–3); Maria Sid (4); Janne Kataja (4); Mikko Von Hertzen (4); Sami Hedberg (5); Jari Sillanpää (5); Sara Forsberg (5); Riku Nieminen (5); David Hasselhoff (auditions, 5); Jorma Uotinen (6–7); Krista Siegfrids (6–7); Ernest Lawson (6–7); Hannu-Pekka "HP" Parviainen (6–7)	Season 1, 2007: Aleksi Vähäpassi (18-year-old beatboxer); Season 2, 2009: Miikka Mäkelä (27-year-old pantomime dancer); Season 3, 2011: VIP Bartenders (flair bartenders); Season 4, 2012: Daniel Helakorpi (7-year-old poem reader); Season 5, 2016: Antton Puonti (24-year-old hand player); Season 6, 2020: Akrotaiturit (acrobatic gymnastic dance group); Season 7, 2021: Sirkus Bravuuri (circus group); Season 8, TBA: Awaiting confirmation
France	Current; La France a un incroyable talent (4–); Former; Incroyable Talent (1–3)	M6	2 November 2006	Current; Karine Le Marchand (15–); Former; Alessandra Sublet (1–3); Alex Goude (4–10); Sandrine Corman (4–8); Louise Ekland (9); David Ginola (11–14)	Current; Hélène Ségara (10–); Éric Antoine (10–); Marianne James (13–); Sugar Sammy (13–); Former; Jean-Pierre Domboy (1); Sophie Edelstein (1–3, 5–8); Patrick Dupond (2–3)^{†} Smaïn (4); Valérie Stroh (4); Dave (5–8); Andrée Deissenberg (8); Lorie (9); Olivier Sitruk (9); Giuliano Peparini (9); Gilbert Rozon (1–11); Kamel Ouali (10–12)	Season 1, 2006: Salah Benlemqawanssa (27-year-old popper/b-boy); Season 2, 2007: Junior (26-year-old break dancer); Season 3, 2008: Alex (23-year-old fire artist); Season 4, 2009: Les Echos-liés (comic group); Season 5, 2010: Axel et Alizée (young dancing duo); Season 6, 2011: Marina Kaye (13-year-old singer); Season 7, 2012: Die Mobilés (shadow play); Season 8, 2013: Simon Heule (23-year-old acrobat); Season 9, 2014: Bagad de Vannes (choir); Season 10, 2015: Juliette and Charlie (dog act); Season 11, 2016: Antonio (42-year-old magician); Season 12, 2017: Laura Laune (31-year-old comedian/singer); Season 13, 2018: Jean-Baptiste Guégan (35-year-old singer); Season 14, 2019: Le Cas Pucine (20-year-old ventriloquist); Season 15, 2020: Famille Lefèvre (family opera group); Season 16, 2021: Le Chœur de Saint-Cyr (military choir); Season 17, 2022: Rayane (15-year-old pianist); Season 18, 2023: Mega Unity (dancers group); Season 19, 2024: Mathieu Stepson (38-year-old magician); Season 20, 2025: Duo EmYo (aerial straps); Season 21, 2026: Current season
Georgia	ნიჭიერი Nichieri	Rustavi 2 (1–7, 10–); Imedi TV (8–9)	1 February 2010	Current; Tika Patsatsia (1–4, 12-); Archil Solomonashvili (12-)Former; Vano Tarkhnishvili (1–8); Giorgi Kipshidze (5–8); Gia Jajanidze (9); Giorgi Bakhutashvili (10); Nuki Koshkelishvili (10–11); Tako Cohrgolashivili (11)	Current; Paata Guliashvili (12-); Avtandil Tskvitinidze (12-); Gessica Kayane (12-); Nutsa Buzaladze (12-); Kakha Grigalashvili (12-); Former; Gega Palavandishvili (1–4); Nikoloz Memanishvili (1); Maia Asatiani (1); Sopho Nizharadze (2–3); Vano Javakhishvili (2–3); Nika Gvaramia (4–7); Ia Parulava (4–6); Khatia Buniatishvili (4); Nanuka Zhorzholiani (4–6); Levan "Chola" Tsuladze (5–6); Ruska Makashvili (6–10); Zaal Udumashvili (7); Maka Chichua (7–8); Stefane Mgebrishvili (8); Giorgi Bakhutashvili (8); Anri Jokhadze (9); Maka Kvitsiani (9); Dima Oboladze (9); Irakli Imnaishvili (10); Tika Patsatsia (10–11); Tako Pkhakadze (10–11); Gigi Dedalamazishvili (11); Mariam Sanogo (11); Davit Porchkhidze (11)	Season 1, 2010: Levan Shavadze (singer); Season 2, 2011: Vano Pipia (13-year-old singer); Season 3, 2012: Nona Giunashvili (26-year-old sand artist); Season 4, 2013: City Band Group (musical band); Season 5, 2014: Temo Da Qeti (dancer and wheelchair dancer); Season 6, 2015: Barbara Samkharadze (14-year-old singer); Season 7, 2016–17: Eka Abuladze (singer); Season 8, 2017–18: The boys chapel and youth team (choir); Season 9, 2020: Lasha Gelashvili (illusionist); Season 10, 2022: Davit Lekashvili (excavator operator); Season 11, 2024-2025: Nia's Studio (dance-troupe); Season 12, TBA: Awaiting confirmation
Germany	Das Supertalent	RTL Television	20 October 2007	Current; Victoria Swarovski (14, 16–); Knossi (16–); Former; Marco Schreyl (1–5); Daniel Hartwich (2–14); Lola Weippert (15); Chris Tall (15)	Current; Dieter Bohlen (1–14, 16–); Bruce Darnell (2–4, 7–14, 16–); Ekaterina Leonova (16–); Tony Bauer (17–); Former; Ruth Moschner (1); André Sarrasani (1); Sylvie Meis (2–5, 12); Motsi Mabuse (5); Michelle Hunziker (6); Thomas Gottschalk (6); Lena Gercke (7–8); Guido Maria Kretschmer (7–8); Inka Bause (9); Victoria Swarovski (10); Nazan Eckes (11); Sarah Engels (13); Evelyn Burdecki (14); Chris Tall (14); Michael Michalsky (15); Lukas Podolski (15); Chantal Janzen (15); Ehrlich Brothers (15); Anna Ermakova (16)	Season 1, 2007: Ricardo Marinello (19-year-old opera singer); Season 2, 2008: Michael Hirte (44-year-old harmonica player); Season 3, 2009: Yvo Antoni & PrimaDonna (dog act); Season 4, 2010: Freddy Sahin-Scholl (57-year-old two-voice singer); Season 5, 2011: Leo Rojas (27-year-old panpipe player); Season 6, 2012: Jean-Michel Aweh (20-year-old singer and pianist); Season 7, 2013: Lukas Pratschker & Falco (dog act); Season 8, 2014: Marcel Kaupp (26-year-old drag queen and singer); Season 9, 2015: Jay Oh (29-year-old singer); Season 10, 2016: Angel Flukes (28-year-old singer); Season 11, 2017: Alexa Lauenburger & her mixed-breed dogs (dog act); Season 12, 2018: Stevie Starr (56-year-old professional regurgitator); Season 13, 2019: Christian Stoinev & Percy (acrobatics with dog training); Season 14, 2020: Nick Ferretti (30-year-old singer and guitarist); Season 15, 2021: Elena Turcan (10-year-old opera singer); Season 16, 2024: Alexander Doghmani (17-year-old opera singer); Season 17, 2025: Jayden Swingewood (16-year-old singer); Season 18, 2026: Awaiting confirmation
Greece	Ελλάδα Έχεις Ταλέντο; Ellada Eheis Talento	ANT1 (1–4, 7); Skai TV (5–6)	23 March 2007	Sophia Aliberti (1); Christos Ferentinos (2–4); Giorgos Lianos (5–6); Nikos Raptis (7); Stavros Svigos (7)	Ilias Psinakis (1–3); Matthildi Maggira (1–2); Vaggelis Perris (1–4); Eugenia Manolidou (3–4); Charis Christopoulos (4); Sakis Tanimanidis (5–6); Maria Bakodimou (5–6); Giorgos Kapoutzidis (5–6); Grigoris Arnaoutoglou (7); Takis Zaharatos (7); Elena Christopoulou (7); Crystallia Riga (7)	Season 1, 2007: Christos Zacharopoulos (12-year-old singer); Season 2, 2009: Kiss Madiam (band); Season 3, 2010: Nikos Georgas (55-year-old singer); Season 4, 2012: Stelios Legakis (14-year-old singer); Season 5, 2017: House of Drama (group of dancers); Season 6, 2018: En Xoro (Group of dancers); Season 7, 2022: Konstantinos Tsamados (14-year-old singer)
Hungary	Hungary's Got Talent	RTL Klub	10 October 2015	Balázs Sebestyén; István Dombóvári	Imre Csuja; Eszter Horgas; Patrícia Kovács; Márkó Linczényi	Season 1, 2015: Dirty Led Light Crew (electronic light act)
Hong Kong	Hong Kong's Got Talent	ViuTV	TBA	Anjaylia Chan; Neo Yau; Tommy Tsang	Lawrence Cheng; Josie Ho; Stephy Tang	Season 1, TBA: Upcoming season
Iceland	Ísland Got Talent	Stöð 2	December 2013	Auðunn Blöndal (1–2); Emmsjé Gauti (3)	Jón Jónsson (1–2); Þórunn Antonía Magnúsdóttir (1); Bubbi Morthens (1–2); Þorgerður Katrín Gunnarsdóttir (1–2); Selma Björnsdóttir (2); Ágústa Eva Erlendsdóttir (3); Marta María (3); Dr. Gunni (3); Jakob Frímann Magnússon (3)	Season 1, 2013–14: Brynjar Dagur (15-year-old dancer); Season 2, 2014–15: Alda Dís (22-year-old singer); Season 3, 2016: Johanna Ruth (14-year-old singer)
India	India's Got Talent	Colors (1–8); SET India (9–)	27 June 2009	Current; Haarsh Limbachiyaa (11–); Former; Nikhil Chinapa (1–2); Ayushmann Khurrana (1–2); Meiyang Chang (3); Gautam Rode (3); Manish Paul (4); Cyrus Sahukar (4); Mantra (5); VJ Andy (5); Nakuul Mehta (6); Sidharth Shukla (6–7)^{†} Bharti Singh (5–8); Rithvik Dhanjani (8); Arjun Bijlani (9–10)	Current; Malaika Arora Khan (4–8, 11–); Navjot Singh Sidhu (11–); Shaan (11–); Former; Shekhar Kapur (1); Sonali Bendre (1–3); Sajid Khan (2); Dharmendra Singh Deol (3)^{†} Farah Khan (4); Karan Johar (4–8); Manoj Muntashir (9); Kirron Kher (1–10); Badshah (9–10); Shilpa Shetty Kundra (9–10)	Season 1, 2009: Prince Dance Group; Season 2, 2010: Shillong Chamber Choir; Season 3, 2011: Suresh and Vernon Group; Season 4, 2012: Bad Salsa; Season 5, 2014: Ragini Makkhar & Naadyog Group Indore; Season 6, 2015: Manik Paul (22-year-old aerial dancer); Season 7, 2016: Flautist Suleiman (13-year-old flute player); Season 8, 2018: Javed Khan (27-year-old close-up magician); Season 9, 2022: Divyansh & Manuraj (beatbox and flute duo); Season 10, 2023: Abujmarh Mallakhamb and Sports Academy (modernized mallakhamb group); Season 11, 2025–26: The Amazing Apsaras (all-women dance troupe)
India	CEO's Got Talent	CNBC TV18	2014	Mini Mathur	Mahesh Bhatt; Raj Nayak; Raveena Tandon (1); Neha Dhupia (2)	Season 1, Early 2014: Atul Khatri; Season 2, Late 2014: Amar Raj Singh
Indonesia	Indonesia's Got Talent	Current; RCTI (3–); Former; Indosiar (1); SCTV (2)	23 July 2010	Current; Robby Purba (3–); Former; Tora Sudiro (1); Vincent Rompies (1); Ibnu Jamil (2); Evan Sanders (2)	Current; Ivan Gunawan (3–); Rossa (3–); Reza Oktovian (3–); Denny Sumargo (3–); Former; Ria Irawan (1)^{†} Anjasmara (1); Vina Panduwinata (1); Jay Subiyakto (2); Anggun (2); Ari Lasso (2); Indy Barends (2)	Season 1, 2010: Vania Larissa (15-year-old opera singer); Season 2, 2014: Putri Ariani (8-year-old blind singer); Season 3, 2022: Pasheman'90 (flag hoisting troop dancers); Season 4, 2023: Femme Fatale (dancers-magician group); Season 5, TBA: Awaiting confirmation
Iran	Persia's Got Talent	MBC Persia	31 January 2020	Farzan Athari; Tara Grammy	Ebi; Mahnaz Afshar; Arash; Nazanin Nour	Season 1, 2020: Navid Rezvani; Season 2, TBA: Awaiting confirmation
Ireland	Ireland's Got Talent	Virgin Media One	3 February 2018	Lucy Kennedy	Louis Walsh; Denise Van Outen; Jason Byrne; Michelle Visage	Season 1, 2018: RDC (dance troupe); Season 2, 2019: BSD (dance troupe)
Israel	הדבר הגדול הבא; HaDavar HaGadol HaBa	Channel 2 (Reshet)	26 June 2007	Noa Tishby	Motty Reif; Yael Bar Zohar; Yehoram Gaon	Season 1, 2007: Keren Elnekave and Yaniv Swissa (aerial acrobatics)
Israel	Got Talent ישראל; Israel's Got Talent	Reshet 13	18 February 2018	Ofer Shechter; Assi Israelof	Noa Kirel; Jordi; Maor Zaguri (1); Maya Dagan (1); Moran Atias (2); Uri Geller (2)	Season 1, 2018: Tomer Dudai (magician); Season 2, 2018–19: The Acrobatics Team (4 acrobats team); Children's shows Season 1, 2018: Acrobit (children's gymnastics team); Season 2, 2018–19: Yael Danon (12-year-old singer)
Italy	Italia's Got Talent	Current; Disney+ (13–); Former; Canale 5 (1–5); Sky Uno (6–12); Cielo (6); TV8 (7–12); Now (12)	12 December 2009	Current; Gianluca Fru (13–); Aurora Leone (13–); Former; Simone Annicchiarico (1–5); Geppi Cucciari (1–2); Belén Rodríguez (3–5); Vanessa Incontrada (6); Lodovica Comello (7–12)	Current; Frank Matano (6–); Mara Maionchi (9–); Elettra Lamborghini (13–); Alessandro Cattelan (14–); Former; Gerry Scotti (1–5); Maria De Filippi (1–5); Rudy Zerbi (1–5); Luciana Littizzetto (6–8); Nina Zilli (6–8); Claudio Bisio (6–9); Joe Bastianich (10–11); Elio (12); Federica Pellegrini (9–12); Khaby Lame (13)	Season 1, 2009–10: Carmen Masola (39-year-old opera singer); Season 2, 2011: Fabrizio Vendramin (49-year-old painter); Season 3, 2012: Stefano Scarpa (21-year-old acro pole flag man); Season 4, Spring 2013: Daniel Adomako (22-year-old singer); Season 5, Autumn 2013: Samuel Barletti (50-year-old ventriloquist); Season 6, 2015: Simone Al Ani (27-year-old manipulator dynamic); Season 7, 2016: Moses Concas (26-year-old harmonica player); Season 8, 2017: Trejolie (triple-duo-comedian); Season 9, 2019: Antonio Sorgentone (31-year-old singer/pianist); Season 10, 2020: Andrea Fratellini (46-year-old ventriloquist); Season 11, 2021: Stefano Bronzato (28-year-old card magician); Season 12, 2022: Antonio Vaglica (18-year-old singer); Season 13, 2023: Francesca Cesarini (16-year-old pole dancer); Season 14, 2025: Joe Romano (33-year-old singer)
Japan	Japan's Got Talent	Abema	11 February 2023	Kamaitachi	Masatoshi Hamada; Takayuki Yamada; Gackt; Alice Hirose	Season 1, 2023: Maria Seiren (opera singer); Season 2, TBA: Awaiting confirmation
Kazakhstan	Жұлдызды Сәт; Zhuldyzdy Set	Qazaqstan	11 May 2013	Tahir Sultan; Daniyar Tolbasy	Tuñgışbay äl Tarazï; Michelle Mukhamedkyzy; Islam Bairamukov	Season 1, 2013: Arman Qarınsaw (19-year-old singer)
Latvia	Ir talants!	TV3	6 October 2024	Rihards Sniegs; Mārtiņš Kapzems	Dons; Andrejs Ēķis; Linda Šeļakova-Paulauska	Season 1, 2024: Mariuss Grencis (14-year-old singer); Season 2, 2026: Current season
Lithuania	Lietuvos talentai Lithuania's Got Talent	TV3	27 September 2009	Current; Mindaugas Stasiulis (2–3, 5–); Mindaugas Rainys (5–); Former; Džiugas Siaurusaitis (1–3); Vitalijus Cololo (1) ^{†} Marius Repšys (4); Ramūnas Cicėnas (4)	Current; Marijonas Mikutavičius (1–4, 6–); Rūta Ščiogolevaitė (1–4, 9–); Anželika Cholina (9–); Vytautas Rumšas (jaunesnysis) (9–); Former; Adolfas Večerskis (1–2); Vytautas Šapranauskas (3)^{†} Samas (4–5); Dalia Ibelhauptaitė (5); Ilona Balsytė (5); Naglis Šulija (5); Ineta Stasiulytė (6); Justinas Jankevičius (6–8); Inga Jankauskaitė (7–8)	Season 1, 2009: Mikas Stankevičius (22-year-old teeth player); Season 2, 2010: Martynas Levickis (20-year-old piano accordion player); Season 3, 2011: Marius Petrauskas (26-year-old singer); Season 4, 2014: Project Mayhem (street gymnasts); Season 5, 2017: Kasparas Bujanauskas (18-year-old juggler); Season 6, 2019: Edgaras Kerpė (19-year-old dancer); Season 7, 2022: Vaida Aleksandravičiūtė (27-year-old pole dancer); Season 8, 2023: Ignas Tamuli (18-year-old dancer); Season 9, 2025: Aušrinė ir Vakarė (dance group)
Malta	Malta's Got Talent	TVM	4 October 2020	Current; Gianni Zammit (2–); Former; Gordon Bonello (1)	Current; Sarah Zerafa; Ray Attard; Valentina Rossi (2–); Gordon Bonello (2–); Former; Howard Keith Debono (1); Maxine Aquilina (1)	Season 1, 2020: Jomike & Lydon Agius (father and son singing duo); Season 2, 2022: Kyran Bonello (14-year-old opera singer); Season 3, TBA: Awaiting confirmation
Mexico	México tiene talento	Azteca	19 October 2014	Rykardo Hernández (1–2); Eddy Vilard (3)	Héctor Martínez (1–2); Ximena Sariñana (1–2); José Manuel Figueroa (1); Kalimba (2); Adal Ramones (3); Horacio Villalobos (3); María José (3)	Season 1, 2014: Pablo López (43-year-old singer); Season 2, 2015: Fernando Badillo (24-year-old violinist); Season 3, 2019: Alexis Pérez (24-year-old musician)
Mongolia	Авьяаслаг Монголчууд; Mongolia's Got Talent	Mongol TV	20 September 2015	Current; Erkhbayar; Former; Ankhaa; Uuganaa; Manduul	Current; Battur (4–); Erdenechimeg (4–); Delgertsetseg (4–); Chuluunbat (4–); Former; Rokit Bay (1–3); Haranga (1–2); Chimegee (1–2); Degi (1–2); Ariunbaatar (3); Undarmaa (3); Anujin (3)	Season 1, 2015: Egshiglent Chimee (children's orchestra); Season 2, 2016: Enkh-Erdene (20-year-old country singer); Season 3, 2018: Bilegt (25-year-old magician); Season 4, 2023: Khasar & Naranchimeg (mother and son); Season 5, TBA: Awaiting confirmation
Moldova	Moldova are talent Moldova's Got Talent	Prime TV Moldova	11 October 2013	Mircea Marco; Adrian Ursu	Mihai Munteanu; Tania Cergă; Nicu Țărnă	Season 1, 2013: Monica Pîrlici (11-year-old poetry artist); Season 2, 2014: Ana Munteanu (13-year-old singer)
Myanmar	Myanmar's Got Talent	MRTV-4	28 September 2014	Tay Zar Kyaw; Soe Htun Win	Current; Moht Moht Myint Aung; Maung Thi; Mg Mg Aye (4–); Khine Thin Kyi (6–); Former; A Yoe (1–2); Rebecca Win (2–3); Myo Gyi (3); Nay Nay (4); Chit Thu Wai (5)	Season 1, 2014: Wai Yan Naing (danger magician); Season 2, 2015: Jar Jet Aung (13-year-old robot dancer); Season 3, 2016: Jimmy Ko Ko (23-year-old contemporary dancer); Season 4, 2017: Ayar Maung Team (traditional elephant dancing team); Season 5, 2018: Junior Creative (shadow dance group); Season 6, 2019: Phone Myat Min (5-year-old acrobat); Season 7, TBA: Awaiting confirmation
Netherlands	Holland's Got Talent	SBS 6 (1–2); RTL 4 (3–15)	28 March 2008	Gerard Joling (1–2); Robert ten Brink (3–7); Johnny de Mol (8–9); Humberto Tan (10–11); Jamai Loman (12–15); Buddy Vedder (12–15)	Patricia Paay (1–5); Henkjan Smits (1–2); Robert Ronday (1–2); Dan Karaty (3–10, 12–15); Gordon Heuckeroth (3–9); Chantal Janzen (6–15); Angela Groothuizen (8–11); Paul de Leeuw (10–11); Ali B (11); Marc-Marie Huijbregts (12–15); Edson da Graça (12–14); Soundos El Ahmadi (15)	Season 1, 2008: Daniëlle Bubberman (13-year-old contortionist); Season 2, 2009: Tessa Kersten (11-year-old guitarist/singer); Season 3, 2010: Martin Hurkens (57-year-old opera singer); Season 4, 2011: Aliyah Kolf (11-year-old singer); Season 5, 2012: DDF Crew (ropeskipping); Season 6, 2013: Amira Willighagen (9-year-old opera singer); Season 7, 2014: León Lissitza (81-year-old crossover singer); Season 8, 2016: Nick Nicolai (18-year-old singer); Season 9, 2017: The Fire (hip-hop dance group); Season 10, 2019: Shinshan (17-year-old dancer); Season 11, 2020: Tommy & Rowan (16-year-old dance duo); Season 12, 2022: CDK JR (dance troupe); Season 13, 2023: Rik & Aimée (acrobatic duo); Season 14, 2024: World of Afro (dance group); Season 15, 2025: Vladyslav & Veronika (28-and-26-year-old dancers)
New Zealand	New Zealand's Got Talent	Prime (1); TV One (2–3)	8 September 2008	Andrew Mulligan (1); Jason Reeves (1); Tāmati Coffey (2–3)	Miriama Smith (1); Paul Ellis (1); Richard Driver (1); Ali Campbell (2); Jason Kerrison (2–3); Rachel Hunter (2–3); Cris Judd (3)	Season 1, 2008: Chaz Cummings (16-year-old dancer); Season 2, 2012: Clara van Wel (15-year-old singer); Season 3, 2013: Renee Maurice (22-year-old singer)
Nigeria	Nigeria's Got Talent	AIT; NTA	16 September 2012	Andre Blaze Henshaw	Dan Foster^{†} Kate Henshaw; Yibo Koko	Season 1, 2012: Amarachi Uyanne (8-year-old dancer); Season 2, 2013: Robots for Christ (popping dance duo)
Norway	Norske Talenter	Current; TVNorge (11–); Former; TV 2 (1–10)	22 February 2008	Current; Solveig Kloppen (5–); Former; Marte Stokstad (1); Sturla Berg-Johansen (1–2); Pia Lykke (2); Marthe Sveberg Bjørstad (3–4); John Brungot (3–4); Stian Blipp Glopholm (5)	Current; Dennis Storhøi (11–); Abdulhakim "Hkeem" Hassane (11–); Stian Blipp (11–); Silya Nymoen (11–); Former; Jan Fredrik Karlsen (1–2); Thomas Giertsen (1–3); Alex Rosén (3–5); Adil Khan (4–5); Omer Bhatti (6); Lisa Tønne (6); Bjarte Hjelmeland (6); Linn Skåber (7–8); Suleman Malik (7–8); Mia Gundersen (1–10); Bjarne Brøndbo (7–10); Janne Formoe (9–10); Mona Berntsen (9–10)	Season 1, 2008: Erlend Bratland (16-year-old singer); Season 2, 2009: Quick (hip-hop dance group); Season 3, 2010: Kristian Rønning (23-year-old rapper); Season 4, 2011: Daniel Johansen Elmhari (11-year-old dancer); Season 5, 2012: Stine H. Ulla (17-year-old opera singer); Season 6, 2014: Angelina Jordan (8-year-old singer); Season 7, 2015: Odin Landbakk (13-year-old guitarist); Season 8, 2017: Vilde Winge (14-year-old sign language performer); Season 9, 2018: Tuva Lutro (12-year-old singer); Season 10, 2019: Amalie Skeide Sandvik (18-year-old sport drill arcobat); Season 11, 2023: Musikaljentene (dance group); Season 12, 2024: Jump Crew (dance troupe); Season 13, TBA: Awaiting confirmation
Pakistan	Pakistan's Got Talent	Geo TV	18 July 2026	Mushk Kaleem	Ali Zafar; Usman Bashir; Mehwish Hayat; Tabish Hashmi	Season 1, 2026: Fawad Alam Khan (blind Qawwali artist)
Peru	Perú Tiene Talento	Latina	15 September 2012	Christian Rivero (1–2); Adolfo Aguilar (3); Jesús Alzamora (3); Mathías Brivio (4)	Carlos Galdós (1–3); Cecilia Bracamonte (1–2); Almendra Gomelsky (1–2); Beto Ortiz (2); Natalia Málaga (3); Dina Páucar (3); Pablo Villanueva Melcochita (3); Renzo Schuller (4); Ricardo Morán (4); Mimy Succar (4); Gianella Neyra (4)	Season 1, 2012: Alessandra Aguirre (11-year-old singer); Season 2, 2013: Rod Martin (18-year-old painter); Season 3, 2014: Gianfranco Huanqui (18-year-old Rubik's Cube solver); Season 4, 2022: Fusión Peruana (dance group)
Philippines	Pilipinas Got Talent	Current; Kapamilya Channel (7–); TV5 (7–); Former; ABS-CBN (1–6)	20 February 2010	Current; Robi Domingo (7–); Melai Cantiveros (7–); Former; Luis Manzano (1–5); Billy Crawford (1–6); Toni Gonzaga (6)	Current; Freddie M. Garcia; Kathryn Bernardo (7–); Eugene Domingo (7–); Donny Pangilinan (7–); Former; Ai-Ai Delas Alas (1–4); Kris Aquino (1–4); Vice Ganda (5–6); Robin Padilla (5–6); Angel Locsin (5–6)	Season 1, 2010: Jovit Baldivino (16-year-old singer); Season 2, 2011: Marcelito Pomoy (25-year-old falsetto singer); Season 3, 2011: Maasinhon Trio (singing trio); Season 4, 2013: Roel Manlangit (13-year-old singer); Season 5, 2016: Power Duo (acrobatic dancesport duo); Season 6, 2018: Kristel de Catalina (32-year-old spiral pole dancer); Season 7, 2025: Cardong Trumpo (55-year-old trompo spinner); Season 8, TBA: Awaiting confirmation
Poland	Mam talent!	TVN	13 September 2008	Current; Jan Pirowski (15–); Paulina Krupińska-Karpiel (17-); Former; Marcin Prokop (1–14); Szymon Hołownia (1–12); Michał Kempa (13–14); Agnieszka Woźniak-Starak (15–16)	Current; Agnieszka Chylińska; Marcin Prokop (15–); Agustin Egurrola (6–12, 17–); TBA (18–); Former; Małgorzata Foremniak (1–14); Kuba Wojewódzki (1–3); Robert Kozyra (4–5); Jan Kliment (13–14); Julia Wieniawa (15–17)	Season 1, 2008: Melkart Ball (acrobatics duo); Season 2, 2009: Marcin Wyrostek (28-year-old button accordion player); Season 3, 2010: Magdalena Welc (12-year-old singer); Season 4, 2011: Kacper Sikora (19-year-old singer); Season 5, 2012: Delfina & Bartek (acrobatics duo); Season 6, 2013: (Ukraine) Tetiana Galitsyna (28-year-old sand artist); Season 7, 2014: Adrian Makar (15-year-old singer); Season 8, 2015: Aleksandra Kiedrowicz (21-year-old aerial silk artist); Season 9, 2016: Jakub Herfort (20-year-old singer); Season 10, 2017: Lukas Gogol (15-year-old button accordion player); Season 11, 2018: Duo Destiny (hand balancing duo); Season 12, 2019: Marysia And Julian (acrobats duo); Season 13, 2021: Krzysztof Jaros (18-year-old contemporary dancer); Season 14, 2022: Miłosz Bachonko (14-year-old button accordion player); Season 15, 2024: Bartek Wasilewski (14-year-old rapper); Season 16, 2025: Krystian Leśnik (12-year-old singer); Season 17, 2026: Liza & Dina (dancing dog act); Season 18, 2027: Upcoming season
Portugal	Aqui Há Talento	RTP1	28 January 2007	Sílvia Alberto	Paulo Dias; Sílvia Rizzo; Joaquim Monchique	Season 1, 2007: Abstractin (breakdance)
Portugal	Portugal Tem Talento	SIC	30 January 2011	Bárbara Guimarães	Ricardo Pais; Conceição Lino; José Diogo Quintela	Season 1, 2011: Filipe "Fubu" Santos (22-year-old beatboxer)
Portugal	Got Talent Portugal	RTP1	18 January 2015	Current; Sílvia Alberto (3–); Former; Marco Horácio (1); José Pedro Vasconcelos (2); Vanessa Oliveira (2); Pedro Fernandes (3–4)	Current; Manuel Moura dos Santos; Filomena Cautela (8–); Inês Aires Pereira (8–); Rui Massena (1, 8–); Former; Sofia Escobar (1–2, 5–7); Pedro Tochas (1–7); Mariza (2); Cuca Roseta (3–7)	Season 1, 2015: The ArtGym Company (acrobatic gymnastic); Season 2, 2016: Micaela Abreu (15-year-old singer); Season 3, 2017: António Casalinho (13-year-old dancer); Season 4, 2018: Ninfas do Atlântico (group of female classical singers); Season 5, 2020: João Pataco and Miguel Tira Picos (acrobats); Season 6, 2021: Fadoalado (fado music group); Season 7, 2022: Acro AAS (acrobatic group); Season 8, 2024: Sofia Rolão (27-year-old gymnast); Season 9, 2025: Gil Brito (9-year-old pianist); Season 10, 2026: FREE ACRO SOULS (acrobats); Season 11, 2027: Upcoming season
Romania; Moldova	Românii au talent Romania's Got Talent	Pro TV; ProTV Chișinău	18 February 2011	Smiley; Pavel Bartoș	Current; Andi Moisescu (1–); Andra (1–); Nadia Comăneci (17–); Mihai Bobonete (12–); Former; Constantin Cotimanis (5); Mihaela Rădulescu (5–8); Mihai Petre (1–4, 9–10); Florin Călinescu (6–11); Alexandra Dinu (11); Dragoș Bucur (12–15); Carmen Tănase (16)	Season 1, 2011: Adrian Ţuţu (19-year-old rapper); Season 2, 2012: Cristian Gog (31-year-old mentalist); Season 3, 2013: Bruno Icobeț (dancing dog act); Season 4, 2014: Brio Sonores (opera singers); Season 5, 2015: Cristian Leana (Rubik's Cube solver); Season 6, 2016: Laura Bretan (13-year-old opera singer); Season 7, 2017: Lorelai Mosneguțu (14-year-old armless singer, pianist and painter); Season 8, 2018: Emil Rengle (27-year-old dancer); Season 9, 2019: Ana Maria Pantaze (39-year-old singer); Season 10, 2020: Radu Palaniță (40-year-old singer); Season 11, 2021: Ana-Maria Mărgean (11-year-old ventriloquist/singer); Season 12, 2022: Darius Mabda (13-year-old dancer); Season 13, 2023: Rares Prisacariu (7-year-old spoken word poet); Season 14, 2024: Cristian Ciaușu (15-year-old pan-flute player); Season 15, 2025: Damaris Lupu (15-year-old contortionist); Season 16, 2026: Re-born (contemporary dance and gymnastics group); Season 17, 2027: Upcoming season
Russia	Минута славы Minuta slavy	Channel One	17 February 2007	Garik Martirosyan (1–2); Alexander Tsekalo (3); Ville Haapasalo (4); Alexander Oleshko (4–8); Julia Kovalchuk (5–7); Dmitry Shepelev (6–7); Mikhail Boyarsky (9)	Tatyana Tolstaya (1–3); Alexander Maslyakov (1–8)^{†} Alexander Tsekalo (2); Leonid Parfyonov (4); Mariya Shukshina (5); Larisa Guzeyeva (6–8); Sergei Yursky (7, 9)^{†} Vladimir Posner (9); Renata Litvinova (9); Sergei Svetlakov (9)	Season 1, 2007: Maxim Tokayev (14-year-old piano accordion player); Season 2, 2007: Dimitry Bulkin a.k.a. Dima Shine (22-year-old gymnastics parade); Season 3, 2008: Grace (ensemble); Season 4, 2009–10: Brothers of Grinchenko (acrobats); Season 5, 2010–11: Viktor Kochkin and Danil Anastasin (breakdancers without legs); Season 6, 2011–12: Igor Butorin (hula hoops); Season 7, 2012–13: "I Team" group (jumping on a trampoline); Season 8, 2013–14: Olga Trifonova (aeralist), Alex Magala (sword swallower); Season 9, 2017: Vardanyan Bbrothers (acrobat duo)
Russia	Я почти знаменит Ya pochti znamenit	Channel One	17 January 2021	Sergei Minaev; Aglaya Shilovskaya	Nikolai Tsiskaridze; Zhanna Badoeva; Alexei Yagudin	Season 1, 2021: Semyon Bukharin (59-year-old artist)
Serbia; Bosnia and Herzegovina; Montenegro	Ја имам таленат! Ja imam talenat!	RTV Pink (1, 5); RTS (2–4); Pink BH; Pink M	21 September 2009	Vladimir Aleksić; Ivana Bajić (1–4); Ana Mihajlovski (5)	Danica Maksimović (1–2, 5); Ivan Tasovac (1–4)^{†} Aleksandar Milić Mili (1–3); Mina Lazarević (3); Ivan Bosiljčić (4); Nataša Ninković (4); Ana Nikolić (5); Srđan Todorović (5); Stefan Đurić Rasta (5)	Season 1, 2009: Danijel, Darko and Sandra Piler (young music trio); Season 2, 2011: Milica Dokić and Nenad Mahmutović (deaf dancers); Season 3, 2011–12: Bojana and Nikola Peković (young traditional musicians); Season 4, 2012–13: Katarina Kovačević (21-year-old singer); Season 5: 2016–17: Bar strong (acrobatic team)
Serbia; Bosnia and Herzegovina; Montenegro	Ja imam supertalenat	Prva	7 October 2026	Marijana Mićić	Branko Đurić Đuro; Luka Aranđelović; Anja Mit; Dejan Milićević	Season 1, 2026: Current season
Slovakia	Slovensko má talent	Markíza	21 September 2008	Maroš Kramár; Barbora Rakovská	Jan Kraus; Adela Banášová; Paľo Habera	Season 1, 2008: Old School Brothers (hip-hop breakers)
Slovenia	Slovenija ima talent	POP TV	21 March 2010	Current; Melani Mekicar (11–); Sašo Stare (7–); Former; Jože Robežnik (3); Matej Puc (3); Vid Valič (1–2, 4–6); Domen Valič (6–7); Peter Poles (1–2, 4–5, 8–10)	Current; Borut Pahor (11–); Lado Bizovičar (5–); Alya (11–); Nuška Drašček (11–); Former; Brane Kastelic (1–2); Lucienne Lončina (1–2); Branko Čakarmiš (1–9); Damjan Damjanovič (3); Rok Golob (4); Ana Klašnja (3–10); Marjetka Vovk (5–10); Andrej Škufca (10)	Season 1, 2010: Lina Kuduzović (7-year-old singer); Season 2, 2011: Julija Kramar (35-year-old opera singer); Season 3, 2013: Alja Krušič (16-year-old singer); Season 4, 2014: Jana Šušterič (29-year-old singer); Season 5, 2015: Jernej Kozan (21-year-old dancer); Season 6, 2016: WildArt (Timotej & Lenart) (string duo); Season 7, 2018: Tjaša Dobravec (24-year-old pole art dancer); Season 8, 2021: Tajda Korče (15-year-old gymnast); Season 9, 2023: Domen Kljun (25-year-old singer); Season 10, 2024: Edvard & Frida (mind-readers); Season 11, 2026: Upcoming season
South Africa	SA's Got Talent	SABC2 (1–2) e.tv (3–8)	1 October 2009	Rob van Vuuren (1–2); Anele Mdoda (1–2); Tats Nkonzo (3–6); Tol Ass Mo (7–8)	Randal Abrahams (1–2); Ian Von Memerty (1–4)^{†} Shado Twala; Kabelo Mabalane (3–4); Lalla Hirayama (5–6); DJ Fresh (5–8); Jamie Bartlett (7–8)^{†}	Season 1, 2009: Darren Rajbal (19-year-old deaf hip hop dancer); Season 2, 2010: James Bhemgee (45-year-old opera singer); Season 3, 2012: Botlhale Boikanyo (11-year-old praise poet); Season 4, 2013: Johnny Apple (16-year-old singer); Season 5, 2014: Tholwana Mohale (14-year-old singer and guitarist); Season 6, 2015: DJ Arch Jnr (3-year-old DJ); Season 7, 2016: Kryptonite Dance Academy (dance group); Season 8, 2017: AnecNote (a cappella group)
South Korea	코리아 갓 탤런트; Korea's Got Talent	tvN	4 June 2011	Noh Hong-Cheol; Shin Young-Il	Jang Jin; Kolleen Park; Song Yun-Ah (1); Kim Gu-ra (2); Jang Hang-jun (2)	Season 1, 2011: Joo Ming-Jong (17-year-old popping dancer); Season 2, 2012: Blue Whale Bros (popping dance duo)
Spain	Tienes Talento	Cuatro	25 January 2008	Nuria Roca; Eduardo Aldán	Natalia Millán; Miqui Puig; Josep Vicent; David Summers	Season 1, 2008: Salva Rodríguez (16-year-old flamenco singer)
Spain	Got Talent España	Telecinco	13 February 2016	Santi Millán	Current; Paula Echevarría (8–); Carlos Latre (11–); Lorena Castell (11–); Xuso Jones (12–); Former; Jesús Vázquez (1); Eva Hache (1–3); Jorge Javier Vázquez (1–3); Eva Isanta (4); Paz Padilla (4–6); Dani Martínez (5–8); Edurne (1–9); Florentino Fernández (9–10); Tamara Falcó (10); Risto Mejide (2–11)	Season 1, 2016: Cristina Ramos (37-year-old opera and rock music singer); Season 2, 2017: Antonio "El Tekila" (44-year-old rockabilly dancer); Season 3, 2018: César Brandon (24-year-old poet); Season 4, 2019: Murga Zeta Zetas (murga group); Season 5, 2019: Hugo Molina (3-year-old drummer); Season 6, 2021: Celia Muñoz (35-year-old ventriloquist); Season 7, 2021: Dúo Turkeev (acrobatic duo); Season 8, 2022: Jordi Caps (51-year-old magician); Season 9, 2023: Lil Kids (dance group); Season 10, 2024: Nataliya Stepanska (36-year-old opera singer); Season 11, 2026: Am Dance Studio; Season 12, 2027: Upcoming season
Sri Lanka	Sri Lanka's Got Talent	Sirasa TV	18 March 2018	Current; Ranga Jayakodi (2–); Chamal Rathnayake (2–); Former; Dasun Madushan (1); Piyath Rajapaksha (1)	Current; Akhila Dhanuddhara (2–); Sangeetha Weeraratne (2–); Danu Innasithamby (2–); Stephanie Siriwardhana (3–); Former; Soundarie David Rodrigo (1); Jackson Anthony (1)^{†} Tillakaratne Dilshan (1); Natasha Rathnayake (2)	Season 1, 2018: Navy Angampora Pool (Angampora marshal art group); Season 2, 2024: Ravindra Kumara; Season 3, 2025–26: Katuwana Sando (strongman)
Sweden	Talang (1–5, 7–); Talang Sverige (6)	TV4 (1–5, 7–); TV3 (6)	13 April 2007	Current; Pär Lernström (7–); Tord (doll)(14–); Former; Peppe Eng (1–2); Kodjo Akolor (2); Tobbe Blom (3–5); Markoolio (3–5); Adam Alsing (6); Malin Gramer (6); Kristina "Keyyo" Petrushina (7–8); Samir Badran (9–11)	Current; David Batra (7–); Kristina "Keyyo" Petrushina (14–); Michael Lindgren (14–); Molly Hammar (14–); Former; Tobbe Blom (1–2); Hanna Hedlund (1); Bert Karlsson (1–5); Sofia Wistam (2); Charlotte Perrelli (3–5); Johan Pråmell (3–4); Henrik Fexeus (5); Robert Aschberg (6); Shirley Clamp (6); Carolina Gynning (6); Tobias Karlsson (6); Kakan Hermansson (7); Alexander Bard (7–10); LaGaylia Frazier (7–10); Bianca Wahlgren Ingrosso (8–12); Edward af Sillén (11–12); Sarah Dawn Finer (11–12); Helena Bergstrom (13); Johanna Nordstrom (13); Viktor Noren (13)	Season 1, 2007: Zillah & Totte (ventriloquist); Season 2, 2008: Zara Larsson (10-year-old singer); Season 3, 2009: Charlie Caper (30-year-old magician); Season 4, 2010: Jill Svensson (14-year-old opera singer); Season 5, 2011: Simon Westlund (17-year-old Rubik's Cube solver); Season 6, 2014: Jon Henrik Fjällgren (27-year-old Sami singer); Season 7, 2017: Ibrahim Nasrullayev (17-year-old singer); Season 8, 2018: Madeleine Hilleard (15-year-old opera singer); Season 9, 2019: Micke Holm (46-year-old singer); Season 10, 2020: Lizette & Lotus (dancing dog act); Season 11, 2021: Johan Stahl (41-year-old magician); Season 12, 2022: Aron Aras-Ericksson (11-year-old singer); Season 13, 2023: Pontus Lindman (27-year-old magician); Season 14, 2027: Upcoming season
Switzerland (in German)	Die grössten Schweizer Talente	SRF1	29 January 2011	Sven Epiney (1–2); Andrea Jansen (1); Anna Maier (2); Viola Tami (3–4)	DJ Bobo (1–3); Christa Rigozzi (1–3); Roman Kilchsperger (1–2); Gilbert Gress (3–4); Sven Epiney (3); Jonny Fischer (4); Susanne Kunz (4); Bligg (4)	Season 1, 2011: Maya Wirz (49-year-old opera singer); Season 2, 2012: Eliane Müller (21-year-old singer); Season 3, 2015: Flavio Rizzello (10-year-old singer); Season 4, 2016: Jason Brügger (22-year-old acrobat)
Thailand	Thailand's Got Talent	Channel 3 (1–6); 3 HD (5–6); Workpoint TV (7)	6 March 2011	Ketseptsawat Palakrawong Na Ayutthaya (1–7); Krit Sripoomsed (1–2); Sudarat Budprom (3)	Pinyo Ruedhamma (1–3); Pornchita na Songkhla (1–5); Nirut Sirijanya (1); Jirayut Wattanasin (2–3); Chalatit Tantiwut (4-6); Patcharasri Benjamas (4-6); Nitipong Hornak (4-6); Kathaleeya McIntosh (6); Pongsak Rattanaphong (7); Cris Horwang (7); Jennifer Kim (7); Yuhtlerd Sippapak (7)	Season 1, 2011: Maneepatsorn "Myra" Molloy (13-year-old classical singer); Season 2, 2012: Rachanikorn "Leng" Keawdee (27-year-old aerial acrobat); Season 3, 2013: Somchai Nilsree (29-year-old singer-songwriter/guitarist); Season 4, 2014: Wheelchair Dance (wheelchair dance group); Season 5, 2015: Thaiphukuew (dance troupe); Season 6, 2016: Duo Soul Sister (aerialists duo); Season 7, 2018: KV Family (aerialists group)
Turkey	Yetenek Sizsiniz Türkiye	Show TV (1–3); Star TV (4–5); TV8 (6–8); Now (9–)	13 November 2009	Current; Alp Kırşan (4–); Beyza Şekerci (9–); Former; Tanem Sivar (1); Kübra Subaşı (2–3)	Current; İlker Ayrık (9–); Eda Ece (9–); Hande Yener (9–); Şevval Sam (9–); Former; Ali Taran (1–2, 7–8); Acun Ilicali (1–6, 8); Hülya Avşar (1–5, 8); Sergen Yalçın (3–4); Eser Yenenler (5–7); Ozgu Namal (6); Murat Boz (6); Seda Bakan (7)	Season 1, 2009–10: Bilal Avcı and Uğur Karameşe (popping dance); Season 2, 2011: Sefa Doğanay (imitator); Season 3, 2011–12: Ali Yeşilırmak and Max the dog (dog act); Season 4, 2012–13: Atalay Demirci (comedian); Season 5, 2013–14: Burak & Kıvanç (illusion); Season 6, 2014–15: Yunus Karaca (comedian); Season 7, 2015–16: Hayatın Ritmini Yakala (orchestra); Season 8, 2017–18: Queens Of The Dance (kids' dance troupe); Season 9, 2025: Aytaç Doğan (7-year-old musician); Season 10, TBA: Awaiting confirmation
Ukraine	Україна має талант Ukrayina maye talant	STB	3 April 2009	Current Hryhoriy Reshetnik (8–); Former; Oksana Marchenko (1–6); Dmytro Tankovich (7); Kostiantyn Tomilchenko (7)	Current; Stanislav Boklan (9–); Olena Kravets (9–); Artem Pyvovarov (9–); Former; Vladsyslav Yama (1–5); Slava Frolova (1–7); Ihor Kondratyuk (1–7); Hector Jimenez-Bravo (6); Vyacheslav Uzelkov (6–7)^{†} Serhiy Prytula (8); Kseniya Mishyna (8); Yevhen Kot (8)	Season 1, 2009: Kseniya Simonova (24-year-old sand artist); Season 2, 2010: Olena Kovtun (26-year-old singer); Season 3, 2011: Vitaliy Luzkar (24-year-old illusionist); Season 4, 2012: The team of "Workout" (acrobats); Season 5, 2013: The team of "Lisapetny Battalion" (singers); Season 6, 2014: The Dudnik Family (acrobats); Season 7, 2015: Said Abd Allah Dzhurdi (23-year-old singer); Season 8, 2021: Artem Fesko (14-year-old singer); Season 9, 2026: Marko Serdynskyi (12-year-old singer)
United Kingdom	Britain's Got Talent	ITV	9 June 2007	Ant and Dec	Current; Simon Cowell; Amanda Holden; Alesha Dixon (6–); KSI (19–); Former; Piers Morgan (1–4); Michael McIntyre (5); David Hasselhoff (5); David Walliams (6–15); Bruno Tonioli (16–18)	Series 1, 2007: Paul Potts (36-year-old opera singer); Series 2, 2008: George Sampson (14-year-old street dancer); Series 3, 2009: Diversity (dance troupe); Series 4, 2010: Spelbound (gymnastics troupe); Series 5, 2011: Jai McDowall (24-year-old singer); Series 6, 2012: Ashleigh and Pudsey (dancing dog act); Series 7, 2013: Attraction (shadow theatre group); Series 8, 2014: Collabro (boy band); Series 9, 2015: Jules O'Dwyer & Matisse (dancing dog act); Series 10, 2016: Richard Jones (25-year-old close up magician); Series 11, 2017: Tokio Myers (32-year-old pianist); Series 12, 2018: Lost Voice Guy (37-year-old comedian); Series 13, 2019: Colin Thackery (89-year-old singer); Series 14, 2020: Jon Courtenay (46-year-old comedic singer and pianist); Series 15, 2022: Axel Blake (33-year-old stand-up comedian); Series 16, 2023: Viggo Venn (33-year-old comedian); Series 17, 2024: Sydnie Christmas (28-year-old singer); Series 18, 2025: Harry Moulding (24-year-old magician); Series 19, 2026: The Hawkstone Farmers Choir; Series 20, 2027: Upcoming series
United States	America's Got Talent	NBC	21 June 2006	Current; Terry Crews (14–); Former; Regis Philbin^{†} (1); Jerry Springer^{†} (2–3); Nick Cannon (4–11); Tyra Banks (12–13)	Current; Howie Mandel (5–); Simon Cowell (11–); Mel B (8–13, 20–); Sofia Vergara (15–); Former; Brandy (1); David Hasselhoff (1–4); Piers Morgan (1–6); Sharon Osbourne (2–7); Howard Stern (7–10); Heidi Klum (8–13, 15–19); Gabrielle Union (14); Julianne Hough (14)	Season 1, 2006: Bianca Ryan (11-year-old singer); Season 2, 2007: Terry Fator (42-year-old ventriloquist/singer); Season 3, 2008: Neal E. Boyd (32-year-old opera singer)^{†} Season 4, 2009: Kevin Skinner (35-year-old singer); Season 5, 2010: Michael Grimm (30-year-old singer); Season 6, 2011: Landau Eugene Murphy, Jr. (36-year-old singer); Season 7, 2012: Olate Dogs (dog act); Season 8, 2013: Kenichi Ebina (38-year-old dance/mime act); Season 9, 2014: Mat Franco (25-year-old close-up magician); Season 10, 2015: Paul Zerdin (43-year-old ventriloquist); Season 11, 2016: Grace VanderWaal (12-year-old singer/songwriter/ukulele player); Season 12, 2017: Darci Lynne (12-year-old ventriloquist/singer); Season 13, 2018: Shin Lim (26-year-old card magician); Season 14, 2019: Kodi Lee (23-year-old blind and autistic singer/pianist); Season 15, 2020: Brandon Leake (27-year-old spoken word poet); Season 16, 2021: Dustin Tavella (35-year-old magician); Season 17, 2022: Mayyas (mainly female dance group); Season 18, 2023: Adrian Stoica and Hurricane (45-year-old dog act); Season 19, 2024: Richard Goodall (55-year-old singer); Season 20, 2025: Jessica Sanchez (30-year-old singer); Season 21, 2026: Nene Royal(15-year-old rock singer and guitarist); Season 22, 2027: Upcoming season
Uruguay	Got Talent Uruguay	Canal 10	22 June 2020	Natalia Oreiro	Agustín Casanova; Claudia Fernández; María Noel Ricetto; Orlando Petinatti	Season 1, 2020: Diego Coronel (26-year-old opera singer); Season 2, 2021: Enzo Castro (7-year-old button accordion player); Season 3, 2022: Camila Iza Machado (15-year-old singer)
Uzbekistan	O'zbekiston Got Talent	FTV	30 August 2024/14 February 2025	Current; Abbbose (live shows); Zarina Yuldasheva (live shows); Former; Ozodbek Khurramov (castings)	Current; Bobur Yuldashev; Sitora Alimjanova (live shows); Ibroxim Axmedov; Former; Shahzoda Mukhamedova (castings)	Season 1, 2024/25: Jansuliw Tatlimuratova (16-year-old gymnast); Season 2, 2026: Upcoming season
Vietnam	Tìm kiếm tài năng – Vietnam's Got Talent	VTV3	18 December 2011	Chi Bảo (1); Quyền Linh (1); Thanh Bạch (2); Thanh Vân (3); Duy Hải (4); Diệp Lâm Anh (4)	Thành Lộc (1–3); Thúy Hạnh (1–3); Huy Tuấn; Hoài Linh (3); Việt Hương (4); Trấn Thành (4)	Season 1, 2011–12: Đăng Quân & Bảo Ngọc (11-and-6-year-old sport dancers); Season 2, 2012–13: Trần Hữu Kiên (26-year-old opera singer); Season 3, 2014–15: Nguyễn Đức Vĩnh (8-year-old Hát tuồng); Season 4, 2016: Nguyễn Trọng Nhân (9-year-old drummer)

=== Got Talent Kids around the world ===
Country	Name	Network	Premiere	Host(s)	Judges	Seasons and winners majority
Italy	Kid's Got Talent	TV8; Sky Uno	2016	Claudio Bisio; Lodovica Comello	Unknown	Season 1, 2016: No winner Season 2, 2017: Unknown
Lithuania	Lietuvos talentai. Supervaikai; Lithuania's Got Talent. Superkids	TV3 Lithuania	15 March 2020	Mindaugas Stasiulis; Mindaugas Rainys	Marijonas Mikutavičius; Neringa Čereškevičienė; Justinas Jankevičius	Season 1, 2020: Jonas Vozbutas (button accordion player)
Turkey	Yetenek Sizsiniz Türkiye Minikler	Show TV	2012	Unknown	Acun Ilicali (1); Hülya Avşar (1); Sergen Yalçın (1)	Season 1, 2012: Unknown
Ukraine	Україна має талант. Діти; Ukrayina maye talant. Dity	STB	2016	Dmytro Tankovich; Elena Antonova	DZIDZIO; Slava Frolova; Ihor Kondratyuk	Season 1, 2016: Arinka Shuhalevych; Season 2, 2017: Veronika Morska

=== Got More Talent around the world ===
Country/region	Name	Network	Premiere	Host(s)	Corresponding seasons
Arab world	Arabs Got Talent Extra	MBC	2013	Nardine Farag	3–4
Czech Republic; Slovakia	Česko Slovensko Má Talent Plus	Plus	2011	Monika Zázrivcová; Laco Kováč	2
France	La France a un incroyable talent, ça continue...	M6	2009	Jérôme Anthony (4–13); Anthony Joubert (4–5); Donel Jack'sman (14); Pierre-Antoine Damecour (15–17); Juju Fitcats (18–)	4–
India	India's Got More Talent	Colors	2009	Roshni Chopra	1
Indonesia	Indonesia's Got More Talent	Indosiar	2010	Augie Fantinus (1)	1
Italy	Italia's Got Veramente Talent?	Sky Uno	2015	Rocco Tanica (6); Lucilla Agosti (6)	6
Italy	TuttiGiorni's Got Talent	TV8	2016	Rocco Tanica (7); Lucilla Agosti (7)	7
Ireland	Ireland's Got Mór Talent	TV3	2018	Glenda Gilson; James Kavanagh	2 series
Philippines	Pilipinas Got More Talent	ABS-CBN	2010	Billy Crawford; Luis Manzano; Toni Gonzaga	1
Serbia	I ja imam talenat!	RTS	2011	Una Senić (2); Unknown (3–4)	2–4
Thailand	Thailand's Got Talent Special	Channel 3	2016	Ketseptsawat Palakrawong; Na Ayutthaya	6
United Kingdom	Britain's Got More Talent	ITV2	2007	Stephen Mulhern	1-13
United Kingdom	Britain's Got Talent: Unseen	ITV Hub	2020, 2025, 2026	none	14, 18-19

=== Planet's/World's Got Talent around the world ===
Country	Name	Network	Premiere	Host(s)	Judges	Seasons and winners majority
Bulgaria	Най-доброто от световните таланти The best of the world talents	bTV	6 February 2014	Krasimir Radkov		1
China	巅峰之夜; World's Got Talent	Hunan Television	19 April 2019	Eliza Liang; Wong Cho-lam	David Foster; Coco Lee^{†} Wu Junmei; Xie Na	1: Wu Zhengdan & Wei Baohua (24, shoulder ballet)
Slovenia	Cel Svet Ima Talent	POP TV	17 November 2015	Peter Poles; Vid Valič		1
Spain	Got Talent: Lo Mejor del Mundo	Telecinco	2 June 2020	Santi Millán		6
United Kingdom	Planet's Got Talent	ITV	17 January 2015	Warwick Davis		2

=== The Champions/All Stars around the world ===
Country/region	Name	Network	Premiere	Judges	Host(s)	Corresponding seasons
Spain	Got Talent España: All-Stars	Telecinco	15 April 2023	Edurne; Paula Echevarría; Risto Mejide	Santi Millán	1
United Kingdom	Britain's Got Talent: The Champions	ITV	31 August 2019	David Walliams; Alesha Dixon; Amanda Holden; Simon Cowell	Ant & Dec	1
United States	America's Got Talent: The Champions	NBC	7 January 2019	Simon Cowell; Heidi Klum; Howie Mandel; Mel B (1); Alesha Dixon (2)	Terry Crews	2
United States	America's Got Talent: All-Stars	NBC	2 January 2023	Simon Cowell; Heidi Klum; Howie Mandel	Terry Crews	1

=== Battle of the Judges around the world ===
Country/region	Name	Network	Premiere	Judges	Host(s)	Seasons
France	La France a un incroyable talent: La Bataille du Jury	M6	23 June 2020	Éric Antoine; Hélène Ségara; Marianne James; Sugar Sammy	David Ginola	1
Philippines	Battle of the Judges	GMA	15 July 2023	Boy Abunda; Jose Manalo; Annette Gozon-Valdes; Bea Alonzo	Alden Richards	1
Portugal	A Batalha dos Jurados	RTP1	14 June 2020	Manuel Moura dos Santos; Cuca Roseta; Sofia Escobar; Pedro Tochas	Sílvia Alberto	1
United States	America's Got Talent: Fantasy League	NBC	1 January 2024	Simon Cowell; Mel B Heidi Klum; Howie Mandel	Terry Crews	1

=== Other spin-offs ===
Country/region	Name	Network	Premiere	Judges	Host(s)	Corresponding seasons
France	La France a un incroyable talent: Le Rappel	M6	21 December 2011	Dave; Sophie Edelstein; Gilbert Rozon	Alex Goude; Sandrine Corman	1
France	La France a un incroyable talent: La Finale des Champions	M6	17 December 2013	Dave; Andrée Deissenberg; Sophie Edelstein; Gilbert Rozon	Alex Goude; Sandrine Corman	1
United Kingdom	Britain's Got Talent: The Ultimate Magician	ITV	18 December 2022	Penn Jillette; Amanda Holden; Alesha Dixon; David Walliams	Stephen Mulhern	1
United States	America's Got Talent: Extreme	NBC	21 February 2022	Simon Cowell; Nikki Bella; Travis Pastrana	Terry Crews	1
United States	Tengo Talento, Mucho Talento	Estrella TV	2010	Ana Barbara; India Maria Clone; Pepe Garza	Denisse Padilla; Luis Coronel	16
United States	Tengo Talento, Mucho Talento Kids	Estrella TV	2025			1
United States	Tengo Talento, Mucho Talento Nueva Era	Estrella TV	2025			1
United States	Tengo Talento, Mucho Talento Mundial	Estrella TV	2026			1
