= Eesti talent =

Estonian television series

- Logo
- Genre: Reality show, talent show, entertainment
- Created by: Simon Cowell
- Presented by: Eda-Ines Etti; Tanel Padar
- Judges: Mihkel Raud; Kristiina Heinmets-Aigro; Valdo Randpere
- Country of origin: Estonia

Production
- Producers: Kaupo Karelson; Triin Luhats
- Production companies: FremantleMedia; RUUT

Original release
- Network: Viasat 3 Estonia
- Release: 9 October 2010

Related
- Got Talent

Eesti talent ("Estonian Talent") is the Estonian version of the Got Talent series. It was launched on TV3 on 9 October 2010. Singers, dancers, comedians, variety acts, and other performers compete against each other for audience support. The winner of the show receives 250,000 kroons (c. €16,000, c. US$19,000). It is hosted by singers Eda-Ines Etti and Tanel Padar. The judges are music critic and journalist Mihkel Raud, who is known for being judges of many other TV shows; musician, enterpriser and politician Valdo Randpere, and model and dancer Kristiina Heinmets-Aigro. The show is produced by RUUT productions and FremantleMedia.The first auditions took place in Pärnu on 14 August 2010.

== Semi-final summary ==
The "Order" columns lists the order of appearance each act made for every episode.

| Key | Buzzed out | ✔ Judges' choice | Won the public vote | Won the judges' vote |

=== Semi-final 1 ===
| Semi-Finalist | Order | Buzzes and Judges' Vote | | | Result |
| Semi-Finalist | Order | Randpere | Aigro | Raud | Result |
|---|---|---|---|---|---|
| Radost | 1 | | | | Eliminated (4th - Lost Judges' Vote) |
| Eduard Einmann | 2 | | | | Eliminated |
| Tartu Tünnipunt | 3 | | | | Advanced (3rd - Won Judges' Vote) |
| Marta Vunš & Edgar Vunš | 4 | | | | Eliminated |
| Anatoli Jevstratov | 5 | | | | Eliminated |
| Kristen Poola | 6 | | | | Eliminated |
| Marlo Randeperə̆ | 7 | | | | Eliminated |
| Kaj Pronko | 8 | | | | Eliminated |
| Meel | 9 | | | | Advanced (2nd - Public Vote) |
| Erki-Andres Nuut | 10 | | | | Advanced (1st - Public Vote) |

=== Semi-final 2 ===
| Finished | Artist | Act | Buzzes and judges' choices | | |
| Finished | Artist | Act | Raud | Heinmets-Aigro | Randpere |
|---|---|---|---|---|---|
| 1 | Simo Atso | Jury Vote Eliminated | | | |
| 2 | Igor Kudrin | | | | |
| 3 | Margit Tali's Group | | TBA | TBA | TBA |
| 4 | Natalja Šabartšina | | TBA | TBA | TBA |
| 5 | Madis Arro | | TBA | TBA | TBA |
| 6 | Ida Dance School | | | TBA | TBA |
| 7 | Eno Lints | | TBA | TBA | TBA |
| 8 | Tom Pintson | | TBA | TBA | TBA |
| 9 | Aleksandra Gorohhova | | TBA | TBA | TBA |
| 10 | Johanna Randmann | | TBA | TBA | TBA |

=== Semi-final 3 ===
| Finished | Artist | Act | Buzzes and judges' choices | | |
| Finished | Artist | Act | Raud | Heinmets-Aigro | Randpere |
|---|---|---|---|---|---|
| TBA | Modyduo | | TBA | TBA | TBA |
| TBA | Grigori Rubanov | | TBA | TBA | TBA |
| TBA | Terminatorz Family | | TBA | TBA | TBA |
| TBA | Mark Oja | | TBA | TBA | TBA |
| TBA | Dance School "Semiir" | | TBA | TBA | TBA |
| TBA | Roman Fedorenko | | TBA | TBA | TBA |
| TBA | Vocdotcom | | TBA | TBA | TBA |
| TBA | Joel Kotsjuba & Eclectic | | TBA | TBA | TBA |
| TBA | Leonhard Kelle | | TBA | TBA | TBA |
| TBA | Aleksander Orlov & Aleksei Žikin | | TBA | TBA | TBA |

=== Final ===
| Finished | Artist | Act | Buzzes and judges' choices | | |
| Finished | Artist | Act | Raud | Heinmets-Aigro | Randpere |
|---|---|---|---|---|---|
| TBA | Dance School "Semiir" | | TBA | TBA | TBA |
| 2. | Simo Atso | | TBA | TBA | TBA |
| TBA | Eno Lints | | TBA | TBA | TBA |
| TBA | Rose-Marie Riitsalu | | TBA | TBA | TBA |
| TBA | Meel | | TBA | TBA | TBA |
| TBA | Madis Arro | | TBA | TBA | TBA |
| TBA | Mark Oja | | TBA | TBA | TBA |
| TBA | Marta Vunš & Edgar Vunš | | TBA | TBA | TBA |
| 2. | Terminatorz Family | | TBA | TBA | TBA |
| 1. | Erki-Andres Nuut | | TBA | TBA | TBA |
