= Benet Kaci =

Kosovan journalist (born 1978)

- Born: Benet Mentor Kaci; 4 August 1978 (age 47); Gjakova, SAP Kosovo, SR Serbia, SFR Yugoslavia (present-day Kosovo)
- Education: Academy of Music and Arts of Albania, Tirana (2002)
- Occupations: TV show host Journalist
- Years active: 2000–present
- Notable credit(s): RTK, Got Talent

Benet Kaci (/ˈbɛnɛt/ BEN-et; born 4 August 1978) is an Albanian media personality, journalist, and occasional singer known for hosting talk shows since 2000.

== Career ==
His career in show business began when he started working at RTK. His first television hosting job was on RTKSound, a music program. He would later present the "News Blic" before going to host Albanians Got Talent on Top Channel. For the last 3 years, Benet has been concentrating on his business career. He made his triumphant return to the stage of Video Fest 2013 in Pristina, Kosovo on 4 June 2013. He also hosted this event another time on 13 June 2014 in his birth town, Gjakova.

== Early life ==
Kaci was born in Gjakova, Kosova and raised in Pristina where he went to high school. He graduated from the Academy of Music and Arts of Albania in Tirana, Albania, with an MA in the Faculty of Music.
