= Central Asia's Got Talent =

- Genre: Interactive talent competition
- Based on: Got Talent franchise
- Judges: Nurlan Abdulin; Gulnur Satylganova; Sitora Farmonova; Alauddin Abdullaev

Central Asia’s Got Talent (Russian: Центральная Азия ищет таланты, Tajik: Осиёи Марказӣ истеъдод меҷӯяд) is a televised Central Asian talent show competition. The show involves artists from four countries: representatives of Tajikistan, Kazakhstan, Uzbekistan and Kyrgyzstan will show their talents.

The show is organised by Central Asia’s Got Talent Show General Producer Serik Akishev, Kertayev (Kazakhstan), KTRK Broadcasting Corporation Producer Kanatbek Kultayev (Kyrgyzstan), TV Safina International Department head Nargis Kassymova (Tajikistan) and Zo’r TV Channel Producer Timur Aliyev (Uzbekistan).

== Judges ==
The judges of the competition are represented by famous people from the participating countries.

- Nurlan Abdullin (Kazakhstan) is a popular pop singer, TV presenter and businessman. In 2007 he was awarded the title of Honored Worker of Kazakhstan. He is the author of many musical hits, as well as the mentor of such performers as Asylbek Ensepov, Rinat Gaisin, the JCS group and others.
- Gulnur Satylganova (Kyrgyzstan) is a famous singer, People's Artist of the Kyrgyz Republic. She is often called the “Prima Donna of the Kyrgyz Stage” and “The Queen of the Kyrgyz Stage”. He is a laureate of many national and international competitions, state awards.
- Sitora Farmonova (Uzbekistan) is a film actress, singer and comedian. She gained fame for her roles in comedy films. The first Uzbek actress to appear in films by European directors. She is also a member of the Asia Mix KVN team, which became the champion of the Major League-2016.
- Alauddin Abdullaev (Tajikistan) is known as the “Madea of Tajikistan” and a famous theater and cinema artist, honored cultural worker of Tajikistan. He is also known as a director of documentaries, but he gained great popularity thanks to his satire. "Alovuddin's jokes" are known to all residents of Tajikistan.

== Summary ==
12 participants made it to the final. Two from Tajikistan, three from Kyrgyzstan and three from Uzbekistan. Tajik representative Chorshanbe Alovatov, 22, won the largest talent show.

Season	Premiere	Finale	Winner	Runner-up	Third place	Host(s)	Judges
3	December 22, 2019	April 11, 2019	Chorshanbe Alovatov				Nurlan Abdullin Gulnur Satylganova Sitora Farmonova Alauddin Abdullaev
