= HaDavar HaGadol HaBa =

Television series

- Logo
- Hebrew: הדבר הגדול הבא
- Created by: Simon Cowell
- Presented by: Noa Tishby
- Judges: Yehoram Gaon; Motif Reif; Yael Bar Zohar
- No. of seasons: 1

Production
- Running time: 105 minutes
- Production companies: FremantleMedia; SYCOtv

Original release
- Network: Reshet
- Release: June 29, 2007 – September 2007

HaDavar HaGadol HaBa (Hebrew: הדבר הגדול הבא, lit. 'The Next Big Thing') was an Israeli television show, based on the formula of Got Talent series. The show aired 2007, with Noa Tishby as the host. The rules of the show were nearly the same as the original British show. The program was one of the most popular reality shows in Israel. Castings for the show were held in Haifa. The jury consisted of Yael Bar Zohar, Yehoram Gaon and Moti Reif. Winners of the first (and only) season were acrobatic duo Karen Alankovah and Yaniv Suissa.
