= Got Talent España season 2 =

Got Talent España
- Season 2
- Hosted by: Santi Millán
- Judges: Risto Mejide; Edurne; Eva Hache; Jorge Javier Vázquez
- Winner: El Tekila
- Runner-up: Samuel Martí Pérez

Release
- Original network: Telecinco
- Original release: 22 January – 21 March 2017

Season chronology
- ← Previous; Season 1

The second season of the Spanish television show Got Talent España - a revival of the 2008 show Tienes Talento - was broadcast from 22 January to 21 March 2017. The second season of Got Talent España aired on Telecinco from 21 January 2017 to 21 March 2017. The series, produced by Fremantle and hosted by Santi Millán, saw the return of judges Jorge Javier Vázquez, Eva Hache, and Edurne, with Risto Mejide joining the panel as a new addition, replacing Jesús Vázquez.

Following the success of Season 1, there was initial speculation about the judges' return. Mediaset España confirmed on 31 August 2016 that Jorge Javier, Eva Hache, and Edurne would remain, while Jesús Vázquez would not return, making way for Risto Mejide.

== Format ==
Each judge has the power to press a buzzer if they dislike a performance, with four buzzers stopping the act immediately. The Golden Buzzer returned for this season, allowing each judge and the host to send one act straight to the live semi-finals. In the semi-finals, acts perform live for the public vote, with the judges offering critiques. A collective Golden Buzzer is available during these rounds, allowing the judges to unanimously send one standout act straight to the Grand Final. The winner is ultimately decided by the public vote in the grand final, securing not only the title of Spain’s most talented act but also a cash prize and national recognition.

Judges and Host for Got Talent España Season 2

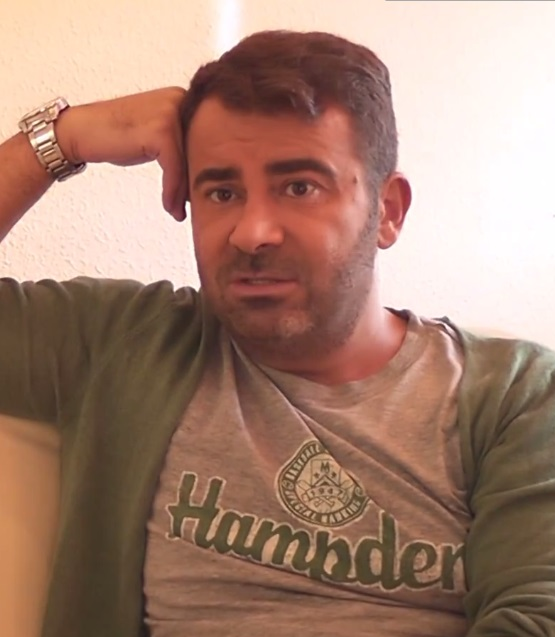
Jorge Javier Vázquez

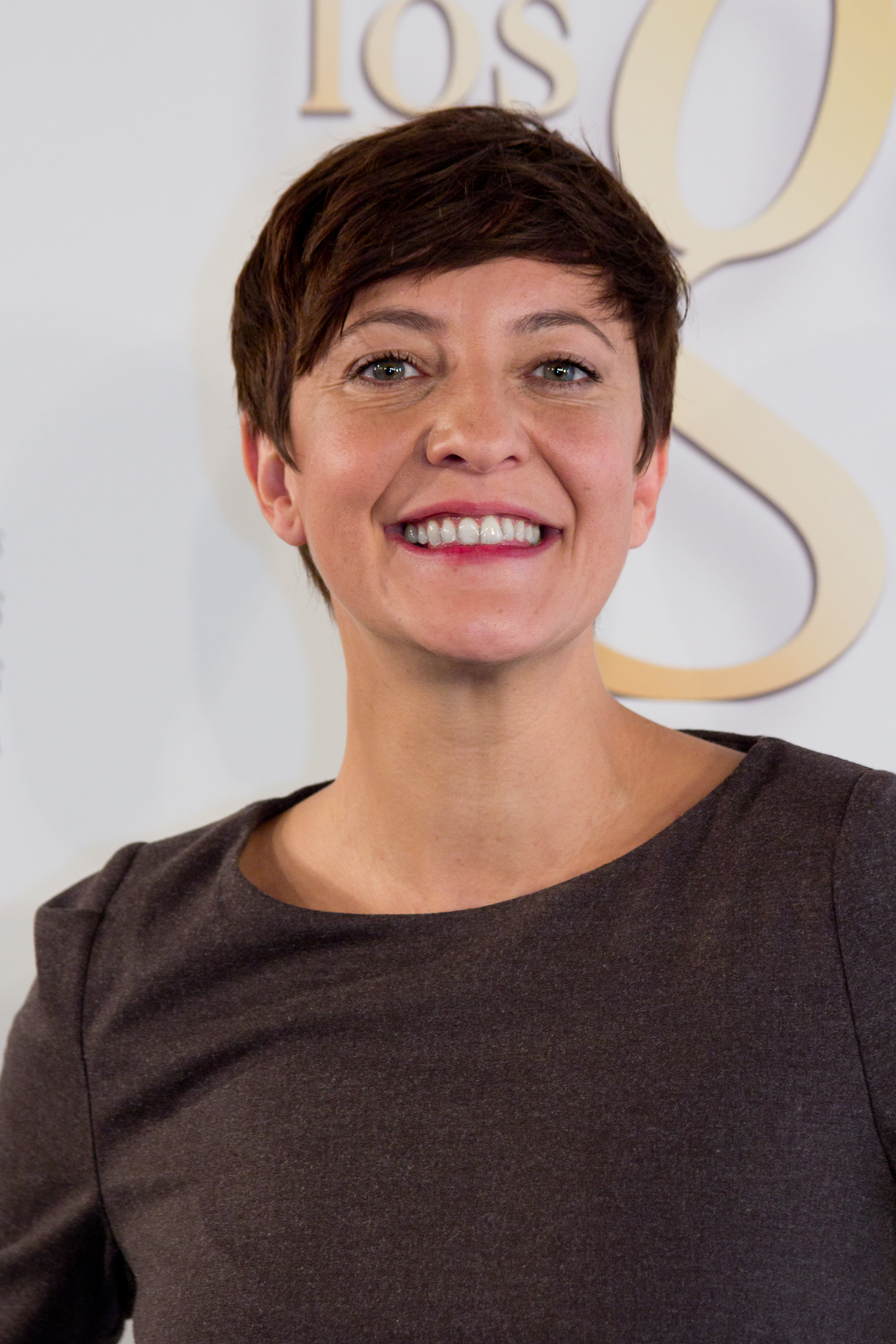
Eva Hache

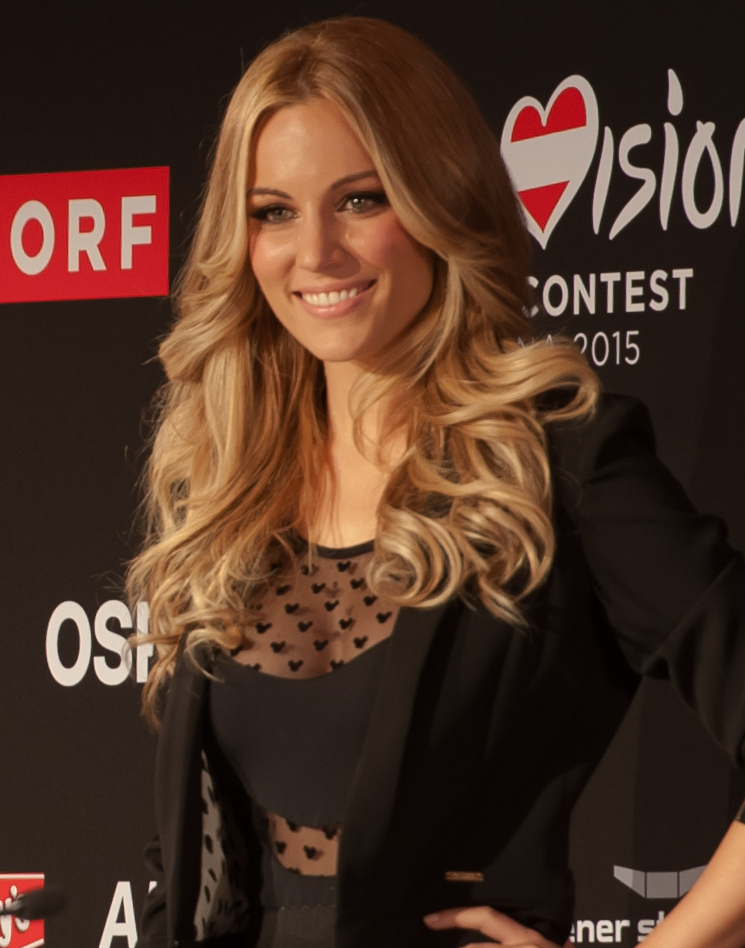
Edurne

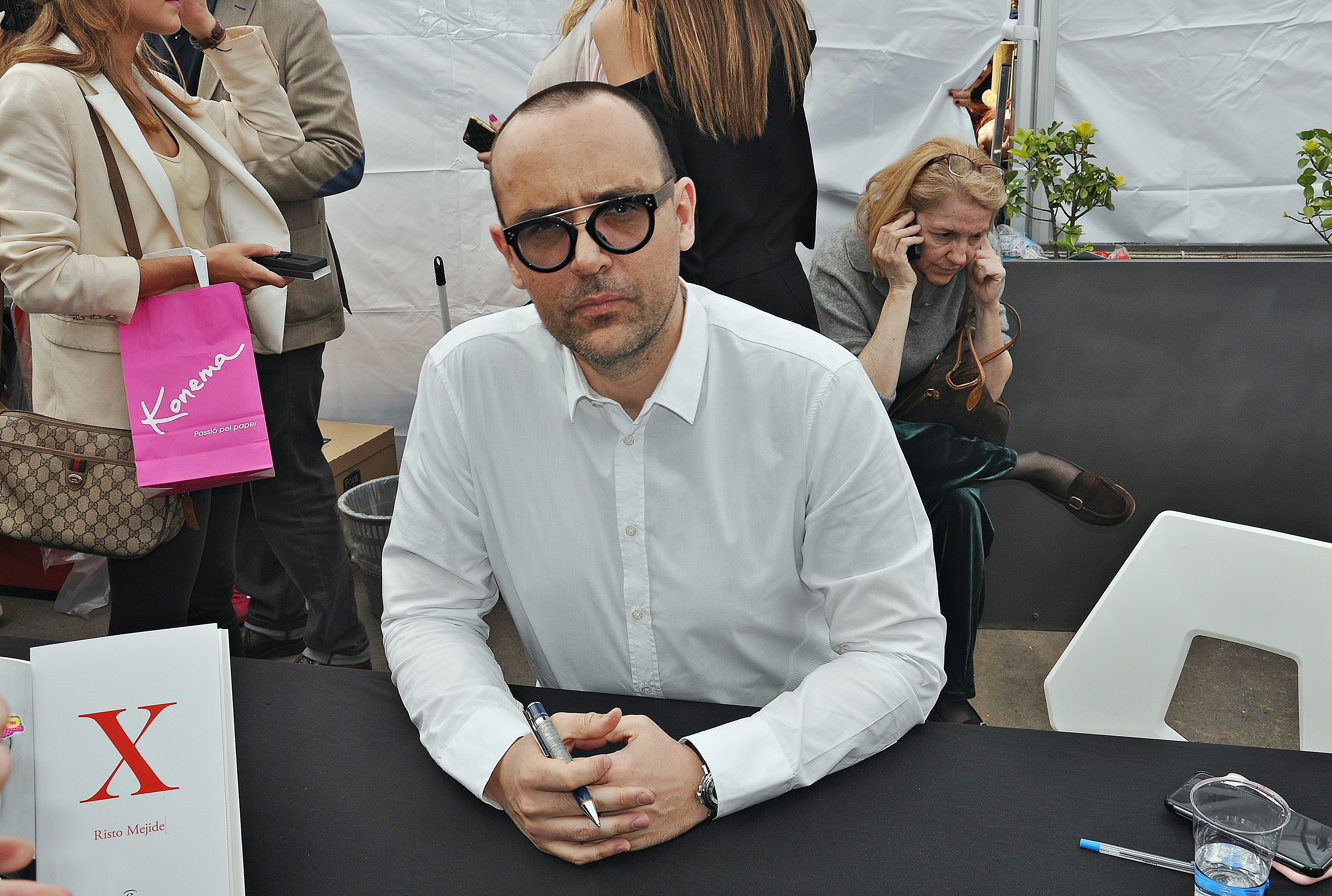
Risto Mejide

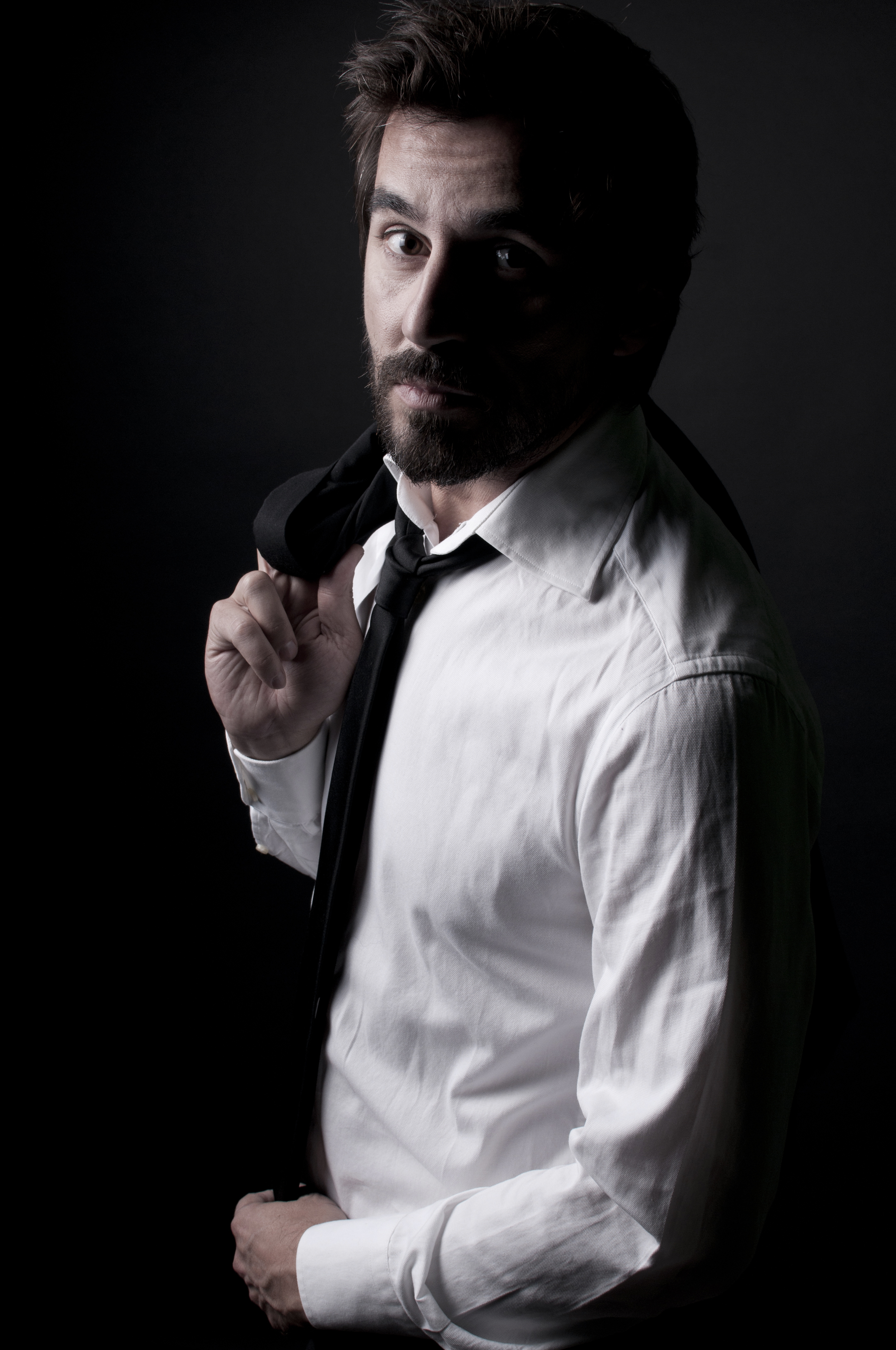
Santi Millán

== Winner Controversy ==
The season concluded with Antonio "El Tekila" Garrido, a 44-year-old rock and roll dancer, being crowned the winner. His victory was one of the most controversial in the show’s history. Risto consistently buzzed him, made it clear he thought Tekila lacked talent, and openly mocked his performances. Despite being buzzed in both the semi-final and the grand final, the Spanish public overwhelmingly voted him as the champion. The controversy escalated when users of the ForoCoches forum organized a mass voting campaign, deliberately backing El Tekila to sabotage the show’s outcome. The move was seen as a protest against the show and particularly against Risto Mejide, who had been vocally critical of El Tekila throughout the competition. In fact, Risto walked off the set during the grand final, suspecting El Tekila would win and openly criticizing the process.

After the final, backlash erupted on social media, with many questioning the fairness of the voting system. Risto even called for an investigation into potential voting manipulation and suggested the result should be annulled if foul play was found. However, Mediaset España released an official statement confirming that the voting process had been reviewed and no irregularities were found. They stood by the result, declaring El Tekila's win legal and valid, and no further action was taken.

Despite the controversy, Season 2 was a ratings success. The grand final drew approximately 2.82 million viewers with a 25.7% audience share, cementing the show's popularity. As a result, Mediaset España renewed Got Talent España for a third season.

== Auditions ==
| Key | Yes | No | Golden buzzer | Buzzed |

=== Week 1 (21 January 2017) ===
| Contestant & Age(s) | Order | Act | Buzzes and Judges' Choices | | | | Result |
| Contestant & Age(s) | Order | Act | Jorge | Eva | Edurne | Risto | Result |
|---|---|---|---|---|---|---|---|
| El Tekila (44) | 1 | Rock And Roll Dancer | | | | | Advanced to Semifinals |
| Javier Masip (82) | 2 | Chin Balancer | | | | | Eliminated in Cutbacks |
| Crazy Hospital (25-29) | 3 | Dance Group | | | | | Advanced to Semifinals |
| Ernesto Y Pico (27) | 4 | Illusionist | | | | | Advanced to Semifinals |
| Lady Malaka (39) | 5 | Tribute Act | | | | | Eliminated |
| Val Semure (40) | 6 | Stripper/Bloody Mary | | | | | Eliminated |
| Svetlana Abalymova (45) | 7 | Opera Singer/Dog Act | | | | | Eliminated |
| Benito Gallego (46) | 8 | Disco Show | | | | | Eliminated |
| Abdeluna (25) | 9 | Drag Contortionist | | | | | Advanced to Semifinals |
| F&B Acrobatics (25-27) | 10 | Swegway Acrobats | | | | | Eliminated in Cutbacks |
| Psico-Fusion Danza (24-35) | 11 | Dance Group | | | | | Eliminated in Cutbacks |
| Manolito "Pies De Plata" (40) | 12 | Dancer | | | | | Eliminated |
| Bruno Sotos (31) | 13 | Singer & Guitarist | | | | | Advanced to Semifinals |
| Alexia Doll (29) | 14 | Sideshow | | | | | Eliminated in Cutbacks |
| Pedro Salcedo (40) | 15 | Singer | | | | | Eliminated |
| Madrid Frao (18-28) | 16 | Dance Group | | | | | Advanced to Semifinals (Golden Buzzer from Santi Millán) |
| Total of buzzes per judge | | | 3 | 3 | 6 | 6 | 18/64 |

=== Week 2 (24 January 2017) ===
| Contestant & Age(s) | Order | Act | Buzzes and Judges' Choices | | | | Result |
| Contestant & Age(s) | Order | Act | Jorge | Eva | Edurne | Risto | Result |
|---|---|---|---|---|---|---|---|
| Mowie Belen Juacalla (24) | 1 | Britney Spears Impersonator | | | | | Eliminated |
| Esther Perez (17) | 2 | Novelty Singer | | | | | Eliminated |
| Nerea Almendros (24) | 3 | Singer | | | | | Advanced to Semifinals |
| Pau Vila (14) | 4 | Scooter Act | | | | | Eliminated in Cutbacks |
| Pablo Camacho (43) | 5 | Danger Act | | | | | Advanced to Semifinals |
| Escuela Luna Egipto (33-43) | 6 | Belly Dancers | | | | | Eliminated in Cutbacks |
| Acheron Delacroix (28) | 7 | Mentalist | | | | | Advanced to Semifinals |
| Juan Cuesta (54) | 8 | Singer | | | | | Eliminated |
| Lil Peanuts Dance Group (8-10) | 9 | Dance Group | | | | | Eliminated in Cutbacks |
| Bubaloo (4-13) | 10 | Dance Group | | | | | Eliminated in Cutbacks |
| Daniela Blasco (11) | 11 | Dancer | | | | | Eliminated in Cutbacks |
| Escuela Carmen Macareno (6-9) | 12 | Dance Group | | | | | Eliminated in Cutbacks |
| Ensenanza Artistica Silvia Barrera (7-23) | 13 | Dance Group | | | | | Eliminated in Cutbacks |
| Edy Perez (25) | 14 | Dancer | | | | | Eliminated |
| Genia and Katya (30-27) | 15 | Pole Dancers | | | | | Advanced to Semifinals |
| Hamish Binns (46) | 16 | Novelty Musician | | | | | Eliminated in Cutbacks |
| Pollito Bandolero (47) | 17 | Singer & Guitarist | | | | | Eliminated |
| Pedro Benavides (37) | 18 | Wheel Acrobat | | | | | Wildcard to Semifinals |
| Marina Marlo (16) | 19 | Singer | | | | | Advanced to Semifinals |
| Joel Armando (35) | 20 | Close Up Magician | | | | | Advanced to Semifinals (Golden Buzzer from Eva Hache) |
| Total of buzzes per judge | | | 5 | 5 | 6 | 7 | 23/88 |

=== Week 3 (28 January 2017) ===
| Contestant & Age(s) | Order | Act | Buzzes and Judges' Choices | | | | Result |
| Contestant & Age(s) | Order | Act | Jorge | Eva | Edurne | Risto | Result |
|---|---|---|---|---|---|---|---|
| Iban Velacoracho (33) | 1 | Impressionist Singer | | | | | Wildcard to Semifinals |
| Kader Adjel (20) | 2 | Singer & Guitarist | | | | | Advanced to Semifinals |
| Shameless (6-8) | 3 | Dance Group | | | | | Eliminated in Cutbacks |
| Maximo Optimo (38) | 4 | Extreme Juggler | | | | | Eliminated in Cutbacks |
| Cristina Portas (33) | 5 | Dancer | | | | | Advanced to Semifinals |
| Santiago Leon (18) | 6 | Cabaret Singer | | | | | Eliminated |
| Paquita Trias (69) | 7 | Singer | | | | | Eliminated |
| Ma Carmen (56) | 8 | Poet | | | | | Eliminated |
| Edison Vela (60) | 9 | Singer & Dancer | | | | | Eliminated |
| Raul El Payaso (31) | 10 | Burlesque Acrobat | | | | | Eliminated in Cutbacks |
| Papito La Ley (39) | 11 | Rapper | | | | | Advanced to Semifinals |
| The Roker (16) | 12 | Magician | | | | | Advanced to Semifinals |
| Woman Style (33-51) | 13 | Burlesque Group | | | | | Eliminated |
| Carmen Snake (38) | 14 | Snake Dancer | | | | | Eliminated |
| B'Boy Salamuni (29) | 15 | Hip-Hop Dancer | | | | | Eliminated in Cutbacks |
| Jerjes El Grande (27) | 16 | Novelty Musician | | | | | Eliminated in Cutbacks |
| Juanfra Anguita (19) | 17 | Singer | | | | | Eliminated in Cutbacks |
| Darth Vader | 18 | Impersonator | | | | | Eliminated (Santi Millán Prank) |
| Yaneisy Martinez (29) | 19 | Singer | | | | | Advanced to Semifinals (Golden Buzzer from Edurne) |
| Total of buzzes per judge | | | 8 | 7 | 7 | 9 | 31/76 |

=== Week 4 (31 January 2017) ===
| Contestant & Age(s) | Order | Act | Buzzes and Judges' Choices | | | | Result |
| Contestant & Age(s) | Order | Act | Jorge | Eva | Edurne | Risto | Result |
|---|---|---|---|---|---|---|---|
| Mess (27) | 1 | Singer & Dancer | | | | | Eliminated in Cutbacks |
| No Limits (10-18) | 2 | Dance Crew | | | | | Advanced to Semifinals |
| Mag Xule (40) | 3 | Novelty Magicians | | | | | Eliminated |
| Ma Carmen (60) | 4 | Flamenco Singer | | | | | Eliminated |
| Nidel Jackson (39) | 5 | Michael Jackson Impersonator | | | | | Eliminated |
| Kanga & Tania (47-12) | 6 | Dance Duo | | | | | Advanced to Semifinals |
| Singclave (23-28) | 7 | Sign Language Singers | | | | | Advanced to Semifinals |
| Silvia Gorreta & Chelo (24-31) | 8 | Singing Duo | | | | | Eliminated |
| Reuben Lazaro (16) | 9 | Baton Twirler | | | | | Eliminated |
| Antonio Sanchez Escudero (79) | 10 | Sportsman | | | | | Eliminated in Cutbacks |
| Charlie De Pichardo (57) | 11 | Novelty Singer | | | | | Eliminated |
| Impact Brothers (23) | 12 | Dance Duo | | | | | Advanced to Semifinals |
| Mar Gabarre (23) | 13 | Harpist & Singer | | | | | Advanced to Semifinals |
| Silvia Mielgo (29) | 14 | Comedy Actress | | | | | Eliminated in Cutbacks |
| Petit Giruka (13-16) | 15 | Street Dance Crew | | | | | Eliminated in Cutbacks |
| Sara Moreno & Vincente (25-27) | 16 | Acrobatic Dancers | | | | | Eliminated in Cutbacks |
| Sico Bana (32-45) | 17 | African Music & Dance Group | | | | | Eliminated in Cutbacks |
| Irie Queen (26) | 18 | Twerking Dancer | | | | | Eliminated in Cutbacks |
| Patricia & Laura Rueda (19-21) | 19 | Comedy Duo | | | | | Eliminated in Cutbacks |
| Solange Freyre (43) | 20 | Opera Singer | | | | | Advanced to Semifinals (Golden Buzzer from Jorge Javier Vázquez) |
| Total of buzzes per judge | | | 3 | 4 | 4 | 7 | 18/80 |

=== Week 5 (7 February 2017) ===
| Contestant & Age(s) | Order | Act | Buzzes and Judges' Choices | | | | Result |
| Contestant & Age(s) | Order | Act | Jorge | Eva | Edurne | Risto | Result |
|---|---|---|---|---|---|---|---|
| Baruca Acrobatica (10-20) | 1 | Acrobatic Group | | | | | Advanced to Semifinals |
| Jurgen Slowing (15) | 2 | Singer | | | | | Advanced to Semifinals |
| Grupo Minisolera (3-5) | 3 | Flamenco Dancers | | | | | Advanced to Semifinals (Golden Buzzer from Risto Mejide) |
| Juan Vincente Osuna (60) | 4 | Sideshow Act | | | | | Wildcard to Semifinals |
| Jairo Moreno (31) | 5 | Thereminist | | | | | Eliminated in Cutbacks |
| Francisco Javier Moreno (35) | 6 | Mariachi Singer | | | | | Eliminated in Cutbacks |
| Samuel Marti Perez (19) | 7 | Dancer | | | | | Advanced to Semifinals |
| Liza Aneghini (39) | 8 | Contortionist | | | | | Eliminated in Cutbacks |
| Cristian Balta (26) | 9 | Bartender Juggler | | | | | Eliminated in Cutbacks |
| Paloma Pujol (30) | 10 | Football Juggler | | | | | Eliminated in Cutbacks |
| Viodance (30) | 11 | Multimedia Violinist | | | | | Eliminated in Cutbacks |
| Saturnalia Show (19-29) | 12 | Blacklight Dance Group | | | | | Advanced to Semifinals |
| Lalo Gomez (56) | 13 | Frank Sinatra Impersonator | | | | | Eliminated |
| Xavi Canellas (39) | 14 | Comedy Impressionist | | | | | Advanced to Semifinals |
| Flow Up (15-17) | 15 | Dance Group | | | | | Eliminated in Cutbacks |
| Naiara Fuentes (12) | 16 | Pole Dancer | | | | | Eliminated in Cutbacks |
| David Fusella (25) | 17 | Robot Dancer | | | | | Eliminated in Cutbacks |
| Fran Jubileta (65) | 18 | Dancer | | | | | Eliminated |
| Inigo Arroyo (21) | 19 | Cycle Act | | | | | Eliminated in Cutbacks |
| Alma Flamenca (40-55) | 20 | Singing Trio | | | | | Eliminated |
| Victor & Sebas (24-28) | 21 | Strength Dance Duo | | | | | Eliminated in Cutbacks |
| Total of buzzes per judge | | | 1 | 1 | 2 | 5 | 9/84 |

=== Week 6 (14 February 2017) ===
| Contestant & Age(s) | Order | Act | Buzzes and Judges' Choices | | | | Result |
| Contestant & Age(s) | Order | Act | Jorge | Eva | Edurne | Risto | Result |
|---|---|---|---|---|---|---|---|
| Porfium Crew (23-32) | 1 | Dance Group | | | | | Advanced to Semifinals |
| Fausto Ruiz (57) | 2 | Singer | | | | | Eliminated |
| Air MDD (9-13) | 3 | Aerialists | | | | | Eliminated in Cutbacks |
| Joe Burgerchallenge (36) | 4 | Speed-Eater | | | | | Eliminated |
| Raul Ruiz (17) | 5 | Motivational Speaker | | | | | Eliminated in Cutbacks |
| Sergio Bech (39) | 6 | Multimedia Singer | | | | | Advanced to Semifinals |
| Enrique Ros (17) | 7 | Blind Pianist | | | | | Eliminated in Cutbacks |
| Bboy Bocas (28) | 8 | Breakdancer | | | | | Eliminated in Cutbacks |
| Sangre Iberico (23-27) | 9 | Music Trio | | | | | Eliminated in Cutbacks |
| Beetlejuice (10-14) | 10 | Clown Dance Group | | | | | Eliminated in Cutbacks |
| La Casa Kids (9-10) | 11 | Dance Duo | | | | | Eliminated in Cutbacks |
| Idaira Bermudez (8) | 12 | Dancer | | | | | Eliminated in Cutbacks |
| The MCB Girls (6-12) | 13 | Rap Duo | | | | | Eliminated in Cutbacks |
| Erik & Gemma (7-11) | 14 | Magic Duo | | | | | Eliminated in Cutbacks |
| Jose Miguel Lopez (11) | 15 | Comedian | | | | | Eliminated in Cutbacks |
| Coplas Con Amor & Humor (22-40) | 16 | Singers & Dancers | | | | | Eliminated |
| Mago Tutan (31) | 17 | Magician | | | | | Eliminated in Cutbacks |
| Ryan Chapman (14) | 18 | Singer | | | | | Advanced to Semifinals |
| Progenyx (14-20) | 19 | Dance Group | | | | | Advanced to Semifinals (Golden Buzzer from Eva & Edurne) |
| Total of buzzes per judge | | | 1 | 2 | 1 | 5 | 9/76 |

=== Week 7 (21 February 2017) ===
| Contestant & Age(s) | Order | Act | Buzzes and Judges' Choices | | | | Result |
| Contestant & Age(s) | Order | Act | Jorge | Eva | Edurne | Risto | Result |
|---|---|---|---|---|---|---|---|
| Sebas & Oscar (12-29) | 1 | Dance Duo | | | | | Eliminated in Cutbacks |
| Hermanos Dorado (34-42) | 2 | Saxophone Duo | | | | | Eliminated in Cutbacks |
| Torocklodones (6-70) | 3 | Music Group | | | | | Eliminated in Cutbacks |
| Hmnos. Venafrente (31-33) | 4 | Blacklight Rings Duo | | | | | Eliminated in Cutbacks |
| Jose Ivan (37) | 5 | Pole Dancer | | | | | Advanced to Semifinals |
| Andres Cocola (40) | 6 | Bubble Act | | | | | Eliminated in Cutbacks |
| Michael Zorzan (17) | 7 | Diabolo Act | | | | | Eliminated in Cutbacks |
| Erik Djinn (22) | 8 | Magician | | | | | Eliminated in Cutbacks |
| Uk & The Leles (9-14) | 9 | Singing Ukelele Group | | | | | Eliminated in Cutbacks |
| Tdrremolinos Orf. Ensemble (12-63) | 10 | Percussion Group | | | | | Eliminated in Cutbacks |
| Jennifer Pannebianco (11) | 11 | Violinist | | | | | Eliminated in Cutbacks |
| Coro Carmelitas (9-19) | 12 | Tribal Vocal Group | | | | | Eliminated in Cutbacks |
| Felisa Mateos (79) | 13 | Singer | | | | | Eliminated |
| Iris & Jose (30-34) | 14 | Aerialists | | | | | Advanced to Semifinals |
| CheerXport (18-23) | 15 | Cheerleading Group | | | | | Advanced to Semifinals |
| Los Mickis (41-48) | 16 | Band | | | | | Advanced to Semifinals |
| TNT (38-43) | 17 | Vocal Group | | | | | Eliminated in Cutbacks |
| Javi Sal (34) | 18 | Singer & Guitarist | | | | | Eliminated in Cutbacks |
| Dolce Clave Duo (27-30) | 19 | Music Duo | | | | | Eliminated in Cutbacks |
| Ending Sequence (26-29) | 20 | Band | | | | | Eliminated in Cutbacks |
| Olmo Jose Heredia (21) | 21 | Opera Singer | | | | | Wildcard to Semifinals |
| Jose & Dabid (30) | 22 | Acrobats | | | | | Eliminated in Cutbacks |
| Eduardo Fernandez (29) | 23 | Singer | | | | | Eliminated in Cutbacks |
| Raymon (22) | 24 | Rubik's Cube Illusionist | | | | | Advanced to Semifinals |
| Gabi Varilla (38) | 25 | Singer | | | | | Advanced to Semifinals (Golden Buzzer from Risto & Jorge) |
| Total of buzzes per judge | | | 0 | 1 | 2 | 5 | 8/100 |

== Semi-finals summary ==
14 acts perform each week, Four of whom will make it through to the final. Each judge can buzz an act in the semi-finals. If an act receives four buzzers, it will be ended, but the public can still vote at home. Also one act out of the four will go through to the final from a golden buzzer from the judges.

| Key | Winner | Runner-up | Finalist |

| Name of act | Act | Semi-final (week) | Position reached |
|---|---|---|---|
| El Tekila | Rock And Roll Dancer | 1 | Finalist |
| Solagne Freyre | Musical Theater Act | 1 | Finalist |
| Abdel Luna | Drag Contortionist | 1 | Finalist |
| Joel Armando | Close Up Magician | 1 | Finalist |
| Baruca Acrobática | Acrobatic Group | 1 | Semi-Finalist |
| Shine | Girl Dance Group | 1 | Semi-Finalist |
| Ernesto Y Pico | Magicians | 1 | Semi-Finalist |
| Iris And Jose | Aerialists | 1 | Semi-Finalist |
| No Limits | Dance Group | 1 | Semi-Finalist |
| Jürgen | Singer | 1 | Semi-Finalist |
| Bruno Sotos | Singer And Guitarist | 1 | Semi-Finalist |
| Xavi | Comedian | 1 | Semi-Finalist |
| Christina | Dancer | 1 | Semi-Finalist |
| Papito La Ley | Rapper | 1 | Semi-Finalist |

=== Week 8 - Semi-final 1 (28 February 2017) ===
| Contestant | Order | Act | Buzzes | | | | Result |
| Contestant | Order | Act | Jorge | Eva | Edurne | Risto | Result |
|---|---|---|---|---|---|---|---|
| Baruca Acrobática | 1 | Acrobatic Group | | | | | Eliminated |
| Shine | 2 | Dance Group | | | | | Eliminated |
| Ernesto & Pico | 3 | Magic Duo | | | | | Eliminated |
| Iris & Jose | 4 | Aerialists | | | | | Eliminated |
| El Tekila | 5 | Rock And Roll Dancer | | | | | Advanced |
| No Limits | 6 | Dance Group | | | | | Eliminated |
| Jürgen | 7 | Singer | | | | | Eliminated |
| Solagne Freyre | 8 | Opera Singer | | | | | Advanced |
| Bruno Sotos | 9 | Singer And Guitarist | | | | | Eliminated |
| Abdeluna | 10 | Drag Contortionist | | | | | Golden Buzzer Advancement |
| Xavi Canellas | 11 | Comedian | | | | | Eliminated |
| Christina | 12 | Dancer | | | | | Eliminated |
| Papito La Ley | 13 | Rapper | | | | | Eliminated |
| Joel Armando | 14 | Close Up Magician | | | | | Advanced |
| Total of buzzes per judge | | | 2 | 0 | 1 | 3 | 6/56 |

=== Week 9 - Semi-final 2 (7 March 2017) ===
| Contestant | Order | Act | Buzzes | | | | Result |
| Contestant | Order | Act | Jorge | Eva | Edurne | Risto | Result |
|---|---|---|---|---|---|---|---|
| Victory Trolls | 1 | Acrobats | | | | | Eliminated |
| Singclave | 2 | Sign Language Singers | | | | | Eliminated |
| Pablo Camacho | 3 | Danger Act | | | | | Eliminated |
| Marina Marlo | 4 | Singer | | | | | Advanced |
| The Rocker | 5 | Magician | | | | | Advanced |
| Sergio Bech | 6 | Multimedia Singer | | | | | Eliminated |
| Madrid Frao | 7 | Dance Group | | | | | Advanced |
| Yaneisy Martinez | 8 | Singer | | | | | Eliminated |
| Genia And Katya | 9 | Ariel Act | | | | | Eliminated |
| Raymon | 10 | Rubik's Cube Illusionist | | | | | Eliminated |
| Crazy Hospital | 11 | Dance Group | | | | | Eliminated |
| Mar Gabarre | 12 | Singer & Harpist | | | | | Golden Buzzer Advancement |
| Saturnalia Show | 13 | Blacklight Dance Group | | | | | Eliminated |
| Total of buzzes per judge | | | 1 | 1 | 0 | 2 | 4/52 |

=== Week 10 - Semi-final 3 (14 March 2017) ===
| Contestant | Order | Act | Buzzes | | | | Result |
| Contestant | Order | Act | Jorge | Eva | Edurne | Risto | Result |
|---|---|---|---|---|---|---|---|
| Grupo Minisolera | 1 | Flamenco Dance Group | | | | | Eliminated |
| CheerXport | 2 | Cheerleading Group | | | | | Eliminated |
| Acheron Delacroix | 3 | Mentalist | | | | | Advanced |
| Ryan Chapman | 4 | Singer | | | | | Eliminated |
| Jose Ivan | 5 | Pole Dancer | | | | | Eliminated |
| Progenyx | 6 | Dance Group | | | | | Advanced |
| Nerea | 7 | Singer | | | | | Eliminated |
| Samuel Martí Pérez | 8 | Dancer | | | | | Golden Buzzer Advancement |
| Kader Adjel | 9 | Singer And Guitarist | | | | | Advanced |
| Impact Brothers | 10 | Dance Duo | | | | | Eliminated |
| Gaby Varilla | 11 | Singer | | | | | Eliminated |
| Workout Dance | 12 | Strength Dance Act | | | | | Eliminated |
| Porfium Crew | 13 | Dance Group | | | | | Eliminated |
| Los Mickis | 14 | Band | | | | | Eliminated |
| Total of buzzes per judge | | | 0 | 1 | 0 | 3 | 4/56 |

=== Last Opportunity - Wildcards (20 March 2017) ===
| Contestant | Order | Act | Buzzes | | | | Result |
| Contestant | Order | Act | Jorge | Eva | Edurne | Risto | Result |
|---|---|---|---|---|---|---|---|
| Pedro | 1 | Wheel Acrobat | | | | | Eliminated |
| Kanga And Tania | 2 | Dance Duo | | | | | Advanced |
| Juan Vincente Osuna | 3 | Sideshow Act | | | | | Eliminated |
| Iban Velacoracho | 4 | Impressionist Singer | | | | | Advanced |
| Olmo Jose Heredia | 5 | Opera Singer | | | | | Eliminated |
| Total of buzzes per judge | | | 0 | 0 | 0 | 0 | 0/16 |

=== Week 11 - Grand Final (21 March 2017) ===
| Contestant | Order | Act | Buzzes | | | | Result |
| Contestant | Order | Act | Jorge | Eva | Edurne | Risto | Result |
|---|---|---|---|---|---|---|---|
| Acheron Delacoix | 1 | Mentalist | | | | | 14th - Eliminated |
| El Tekila | 2 | Rock And Roll Dancer | | | | | 1st - Winner |
| Mar Gabarre | 3 | Harp Player And Singer | | | | | 10th - Eliminated |
| Madrid Frao | 4 | Dance Group | | | | | 5th - Eliminated |
| The Roker | 5 | Magician | | | | | 9th - Eliminated |
| Solagne Freyre | 6 | Opera Singer | | | | | 7th Finalist |
| Iban Velacoracho | 7 | Celebrity Impressionist Singer | | | | | 11th - Finalist |
| Samuel Martí Pérez | 8 | Dancer | | | | | 2nd - Runners-up |
| Kader Adjel | 9 | Singer | | | | | 8th - Eliminated |
| Joel Armando | 10 | Close Up Magician | | | | | 4th - Eliminated |
| Abdeluna | 11 | Drag Contortionist | | | | | 12th - Eliminated |
| Kanga And Tania | 12 | Dancers | | | | | 13th - Eliminated |
| Marina Marlo | 13 | Singer | | | | | 6th - Eliminated |
| Progenyx | 14 | Dance Group | | | | | 3rd - Eliminated |
| Total of buzzes per judge | | | 0 | 0 | 0 | 2 | 2/56 |

== Specials Summary ==
=== Junior Special (4 April 2017) ===
| Contestant | Chosen by | Order | Act | Buzzes & Votes | | | | Result |
| Contestant | Chosen by | Order | Act | Jorge | Eva | Edurne | Risto | Result |
|---|---|---|---|---|---|---|---|---|
| Weryu | Jorge | 1 | Flamenco Singer | | | | | Top 5 |
| Bichiswaag & Lil' Peanuts | Jorge | 2 | Dance Crew | | | | | Eliminated |
| Dianne Jacob | Jorge | 3 | Singer | | | | | Eliminated |
| Jose Miguel Lopez | Eva | 4 | Comedian | | | | | Eliminated |
| Ryan Chapman & Enrique Ros | Eva | 5 | Singer/Pianist Duo | | | | | Eliminated |
| Gym Victory | Eva | 6 | Clown Dance Group | | | | | Top 5 |
| Nassim & Nayara | Edurne | 7 | Wheelchair Dance Duo | | | | | Eliminated |
| Idaira Bermudez | Edurne | 8 | Dancer | | | | | Eliminated |
| Jurgen Slowing | Edurne | 9 | Singer | | | | | Top 5 |
| Marina Marlo & David Tejada | Risto | 10 | Singer & Dancer | | | | | Winner |
| Air MDD | Risto | 11 | Aerial Group | | | | | Eliminated |
| Jennifer Panebianco | Risto | 12 | Violinist | | | | | Eliminated |
| Pedro Pablo Martinez | Santi | 13 | Singer & Dancer | | | | | Top 5 |
| Total of buzzes per judge | | | | 0 | 0 | 0 | 0 | 0/52 |

=== Magic Special (16 April 2017) ===
Jesús Vázquez made a guest appearance in this episode, and briefly joined the judging panel to help decide the winner.

| Contestant | Chosen by | Order | Act | Buzzes & Votes | | | | Result |
| Contestant | Chosen by | Order | Act | Jorge | Eva | Edurne | Risto | Result |
|---|---|---|---|---|---|---|---|---|
| Pinilla | Jorge | 1 | Escape Artist | | | | | Eliminated |
| Manuel Alcalde | Jorge | 2 | Card Magician | | | | | Eliminated |
| Ivan Asenjo | Jorge | 3 | Illusionist | | | | | Top 5 |
| Ivan Ojeda | Edurne | 4 | Sleight of Hand Magician | | | | | Eliminated |
| Erik & Gemma | Edurne | 5 | Quick-Change Duo | | | | | Eliminated |
| Acheron Delecroix | Edurne | 6 | Danger Magician | | | | | Top 5 |
| Ernesto & Pico | Eva | 7 | Magic Duo | | | | | Eliminated |
| Tutan | Eva | 8 | Comedy Magician | | | | | Eliminated |
| Joel Armando | Eva | 9 | Close-up Magician | | | | | Winner |
| Raymon | Risto | 10 | Card Illusionist | | | | | Eliminated |
| Erik Djinn | Risto | 11 | Mind-Reader | | | | | Eliminated |
| The Roker | Risto | 12 | Magician | | | | | Top 5 |
| Draun | Jesús Vázquez | 13 | Sleight of Hand Magician | | | | | Top 5 |
| Total of buzzes per judge | | | | 0 | 0 | 0 | 0 | 0/52 |

=== Dance Special (18 April 2017) ===
| Contestant | Chosen by | Order | Act | Buzzes & Votes | | | | Result |
| Contestant | Chosen by | Order | Act | Jorge | Eva | Edurne | Risto | Result |
|---|---|---|---|---|---|---|---|---|
| Ballet Kebanna | Jorge | 1 | Dance Troupe | | | | | Eliminated |
| Fonty | Jorge | 2 | Breakdancer | | | | | Top 5 |
| Light Shock | Jorge | 3 | Blacklight Dance Crew | | | | | Eliminated |
| David & Javi | Edurne | 4 | Freestyle Dance Duo | | | | | Top 5 |
| Madrid Frao | Edurne | 5 | Dance Crew | | | | | Eliminated |
| Psicofusion Danza | Edurne | 6 | Interpretive Dance Trio | | | | | Eliminated |
| Freak Twins | Eva | 7 | Dance Duo | | | | | Eliminated |
| Zistarlity | Eva | 8 | Dance Group | | | | | Top 5 |
| Samuel Marti | Eva | 9 | Dancer | | | | | Eliminated |
| The Porfiunm Crew | Risto | 10 | Dancers | | | | | Eliminated |
| Tania Cornet | Risto | 11 | Solo Dancer | | | | | Eliminated |
| X-Adows | Risto | 12 | Street Dance Crew | | | | | Winner |
| Lady Malaka | Santi | 13 | Lady Gaga Impersonator | | | | | Top 5 |
| Total of buzzes per judge | | | | 1 | 0 | 1 | 1 | 3/52 |

=== Judges' Buzzes ===
| Judge | Buzz Total |
|---|---|
| Jorge Javier Vázquez | 25 |
| Eva Hache | 25 |
| Edurne | 30 |
| Risto Mejide | 55 |
| Total | 135 |

== Ratings ==
| Order | Episode | Viewers (millions) | Share |
|---|---|---|---|
| 1 | "Auditions 1" | 2.66 | 16.8% |
| 2 | "Auditions 2" | 2.88 | 20.3% |
| 3 | "Auditions 3" | 2.71 | 17.0% |
| 4 | "Auditions 4" | 3.38 | 22.3% |
| 5 | "Greatest Moments Special" | 1.30 | 7.7% |
| 6 | "Auditions 5" | 2.59 | 19.8% |
| 7 | "Auditions 6" | 2.78 | 21.7% |
| 8 | "Auditions 7" | 2.97 | 23.3% |
| 9 | "Semi-final 1" | 2.94 | 23.8% |
| 10 | "Semi-final 2" | 2.26 | 19.5% |
| 11 | "Semi-final 3" | 2.64 | 22.5% |
| 12 | "Last Opportunity - Wildcards" | 2.27 | 11.8% |
| 13 | "Grand Final" | 2.82 | 25.7% |
| 14 | "Got Talent: Junior Special" | 1.70 | 14.7% |
| 15 | "Got Talent: Magic Special" | 1.52 | 11.7% |
| 16 | "Got Talent: Dance Special" | 1.49 | 13.2% |
