= Lorelai Moșneguțu =

Romanian singer and pianist

- Born: 2003 (age 22–23); Targoviste, Romania
- Occupations: Pianist, singer
- Known for: Winning the seventh season of Romania's Got Talent

Lorelai Alberta Moșneguțu (born 2003 in Târgoviște, Dâmbovița) is a Romanian singer and pianist without hands, due to a birth defect. She plays the piano with her feet. At the age of 14, Lorelai won the 7th season of the Romania's Got Talent obtaining the prize of €120,000.
