= Valdo Randpere =

Estonian politician, musician and entrepreneur

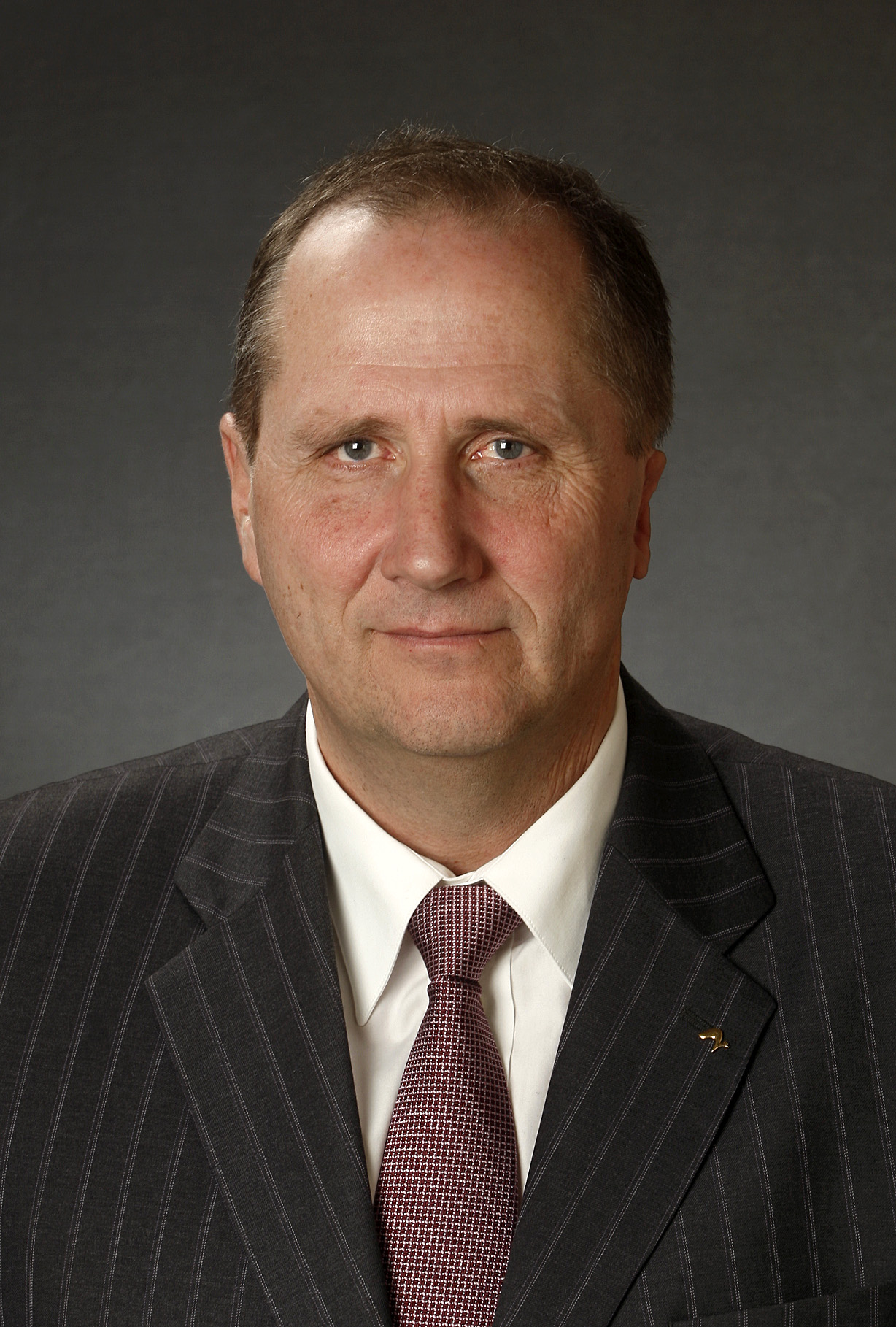
- Valdo Randpere in April 2011
- Born: 4 February 1958 (age 68); Tallinn, then part of Estonian SSR, Soviet Union
- Education: University of Tartu
- Occupations: Musician, businessman, politician

Valdo Randpere (born 4 February 1958) is an Estonian politician, musician and businessman.

Randpere was born in Tallinn and graduated from the University of Tartu with a law degree (cum laude) in 1982.

In 1984, he escaped from Soviet Estonia together with his then wife Leila Miller and moved to Sweden.

From 1998 Valdo Randpere served as general manager for IBM Estonia.

In 2008, Valdo Randpere won the Estonian version of the Just the Two of Us (Laulud Tähtedega) reality television singing contest in duet with Estonian singer Eda-Ines Etti.

Randpere has been an elected member of Estonian Riigikogu since 2011. In the 2023 elections he received 1,169 votes in electoral district number 2, which covers Tallinn Central, Lasnamäe, and Pirita districts. Randpere entered the Riigikogu as a substitute for Heidy Purga, who became the Minister of Culture.
