= Asia's Got Talent season 2 =

Asia's Got Talent
- Season 2
- Hosted by: Alan Wong; Justin Bratton
- Judges: Anggun; David Foster; Jay Park
- Winner: The Sacred Riana
- Runner-up: DM-X Comvaleñoz

Release
- Original network: AXN Asia
- Original release: October 12 – December 14, 2017

Season chronology
- ← Previous; Season 1 Next → Season 3

The second season of Asia's Got Talent (AGT) premiered on October 12, 2017, at 8:30 pm (UTC+8) across 27 countries in Asia. The winning act received a grand prize of US$100,000.

The show was hosted by Alan Wong and Justin Bratton, replacing Marc Nelson and Rovilson Fernandez from the prior season. David Foster and Anggun returned as judges, while Melanie C and Vanness Wu were replaced by Jay Park.

The official sponsor for the season was Traveloka while Indonesian magician The Sacred Riana was the season winner.

== Auditions ==
Season 2 Judges

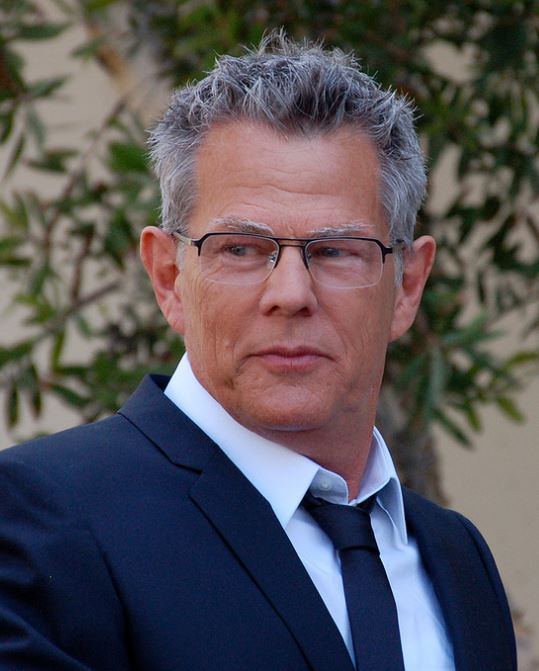
David Foster

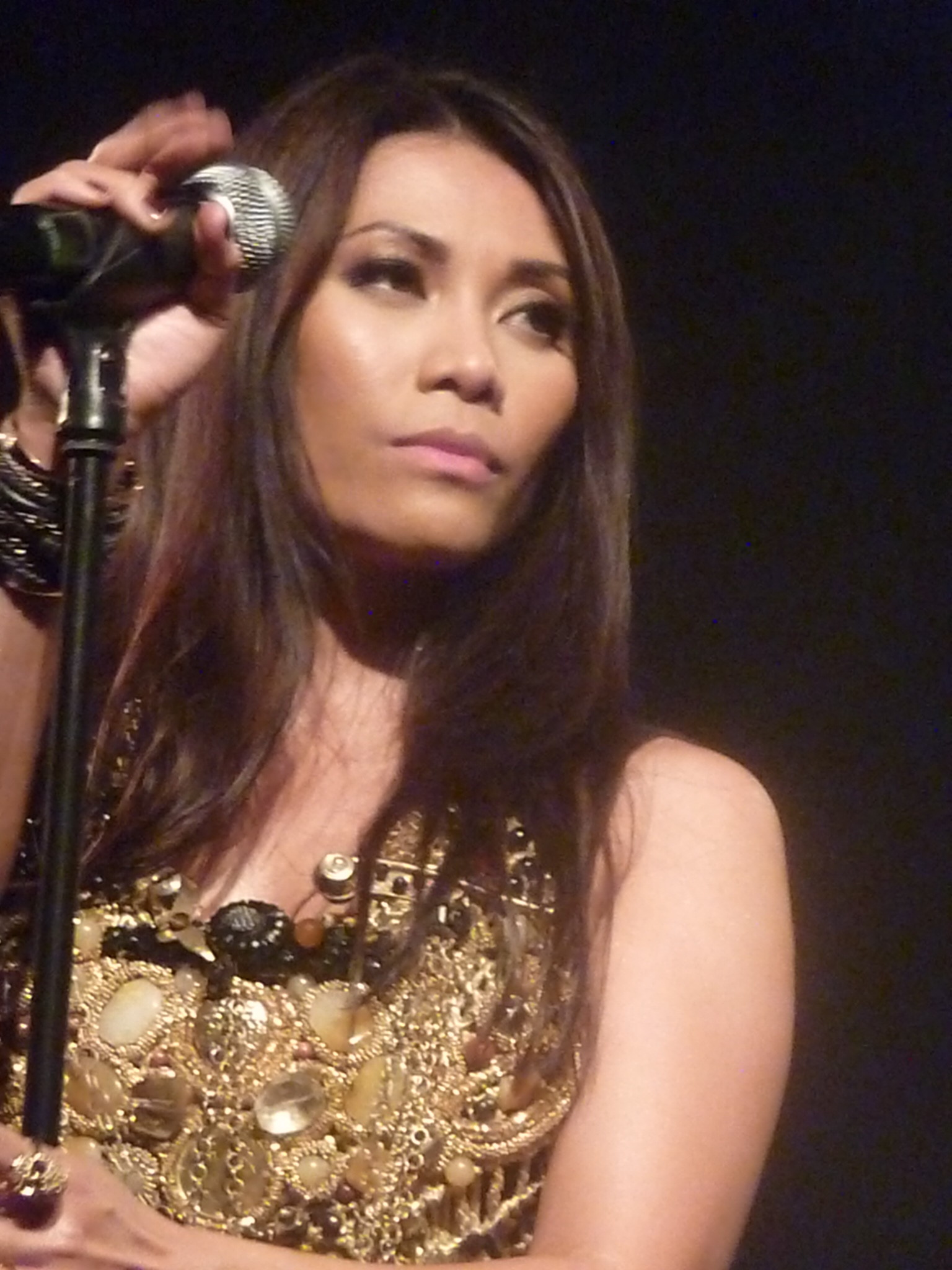
Anggun

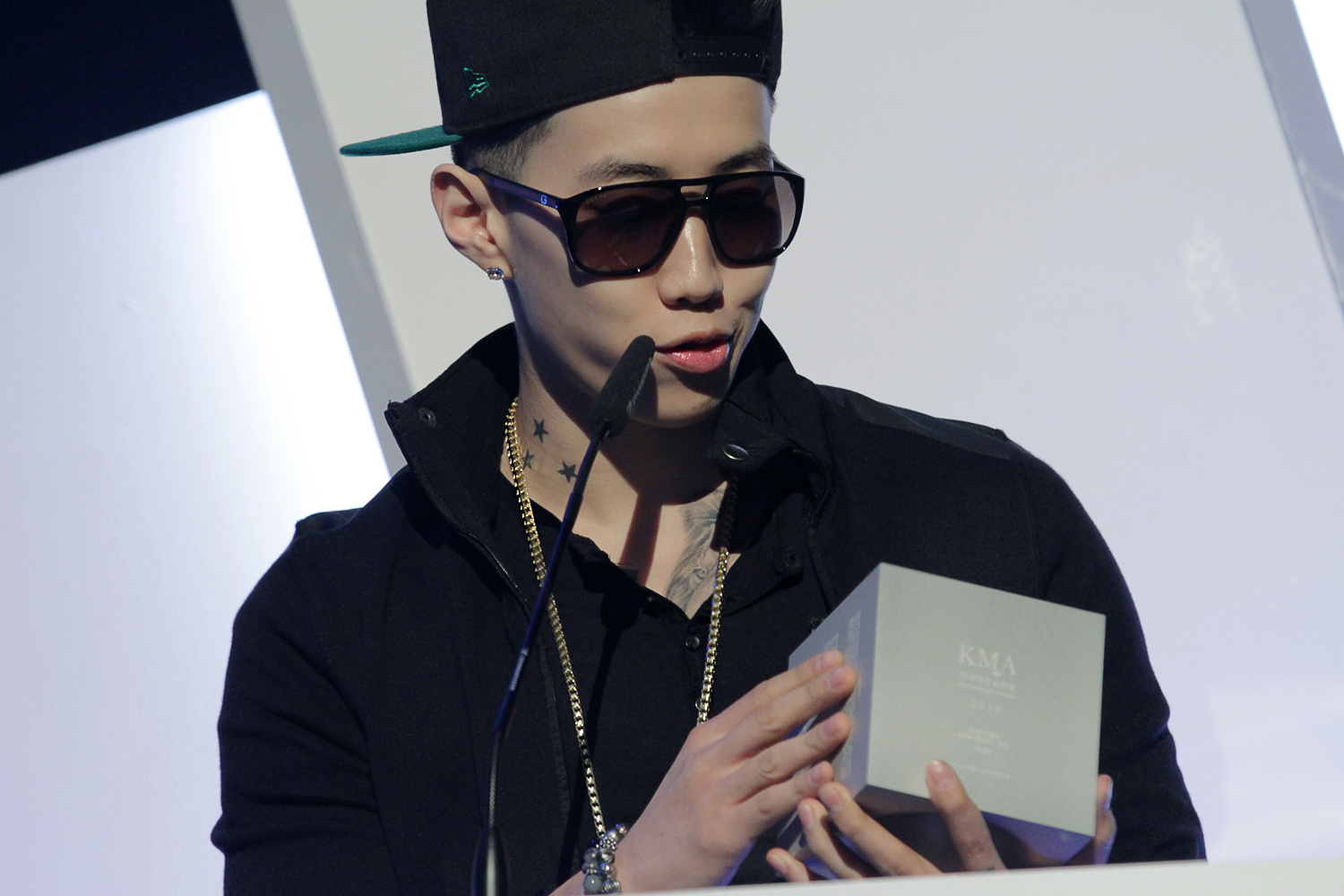
Jay Park

=== Open auditions ===
The open auditions for the second season took place in key cities in Asia. Open auditions were held in Singapore, Malaysia, Philippines, Taiwan, Thailand, and Indonesia. The open auditions were judged by Asia's Got Talent producers. Auditionees were also allowed to submit their audition videos online via the show's official website. Those who passed will proceed to the live judges' auditions.

Date of Open Audition	Open Audition Venue	City	Ref.
April 10 – June 8, 2017	Online Auditions		
May 14, 2017	Marina Bay Sands	Downtown Core, Singapore	
May 20, 2017	Sunway City	Selangor, Malaysia	
May 21, 2017	Quezon City Experience	Quezon City, Metro Manila, Philippines	
May 27, 2017	Syntrend Creative Park	Taipei, Taiwan	
May 28, 2017	Kasem Bundit University	Bangkok, Thailand	
June 3, 2017	Wisma Serbaguna Senayan	Jakarta, Indonesia	

=== Judges' auditions ===
The judges' auditions were taped from July 28, 2017, at the Pinewood Iskandar Malaysia Studios in Johor, Malaysia like the first season.

This is the first season of the show to have three judges instead of four. This is also the first season where the hosts (as one) get an opportunity to press the golden buzzer.

The judges' auditions once again feature the Golden Buzzer. Each judge would have one chance to use the Golden Buzzer. New for this season, apart from the judges, the hosts (as one) get an opportunity to press the golden buzzer. The so-called Golden Acts, those on whom the Golden Buzzer is used, would automatically advance to the semifinals. Jay Park pressed his golden buzzer for Kyrgyz contortionist dance group, ADEM Dance Crew on the premiere episode. It was followed by Anggun who pressed the buzzer on the second episode for the Japanese comedic magician, Akira Kimura. Alan Wong and Justin Bratton would then use the golden buzzer together on Mongolian digital dancer, Canion Shijirbat. Finally, David Foster used the last golden buzzer on Taiwanese electric ukuleleist, Feng E.

Below are the acts who are confirmed within the show to have received at least two Yes votes and thus had successfully passed their auditions, as well as the Golden Acts. The list does not cover everyone who had passed. Due to time constraints, some acts, named or otherwise, are seen with their fates partially known (only one known Yes vote) or edited out completely from broadcast and are thus not listed.

Successful auditionees of Asia's Got Talent season 2
- Pai Shih Wei – singing palms performer
- DM-X Comvaleñoz – hiphop dance group
- SMB – acro-dancers
- D'Intensity Breakers – hooping dance group
- The Sisters – sopranos
- Champ Suppawat – singer/rapper
- Mercifuletes Viola – singer/rapper
- Edward Tirtananda – tenor
- Garbkamol Limangkul – yo-yo player
- Prasheela Ramesh – singer
- Jay Tjung – aerial pole dancer
- Yumbo Dump – comic duo
- Andrew Lee – magician/mentalist
- ADEM Dance Crew – contortionist dance group
- Baby Storm – children dance group
- Awksome Cooking Angels – dance troupe
- Little K-Tigers – martial arts troupe
- Alfred Ho – blind singer/acoustic guitarist
- Garrett Bolden Jr. – singer
- Angel Tornado – neo-traditional dance group
- 218 Dance Crew – tron dance group
- Triyogini – aerialist trio
- Ryun Jin – pole dancer
- 3GagaHeads – comic performance artist troupe
- Fitri Cerado – singer/keyboardist
- Akira Kimura – comic magician
- Rocket Stunt Crew – double Dutch act
- Urban Crew – hiphop dance group
- Toy-Z – street dancer
- The Sacred Riana – spooky magician
- Bikoon! – comic stunt duo
- D'Gemini – hiphop dance duo
- Quinn Calista Masongsong – singer
- Vimolwan Saisathit – electric guitarist
- Cindy Kuncoro – drummer
- Krittaya Ariyasit – aerialist
- J.Andes Group – musical ensemble
- XTRAP – finger tutting group
- Lauren Yeo – soprano
- Mafarikha Akhir – singer
- Viriya Rici – breakdancer
- Power Storm Crew – b-boy dance group
- Christ Mahendra – pianist
- Nyamgerel Gankhuyag - contortionist
- Deniel Sarmiento – contortionist/contemporary dancer
- Ekklesia – pop opera trio
- Canion Shijirbat – digital dancer
- Syah Riszuan – singer
- Pannawach Dechapanya – singer
- Ta O – cube spinner
- Li Jun – acrobatic performer
- The Juans – boy band
- The Phoenix Team - street workout performers
- Stripboys - comic dance group
- Vin Chee – magician
- Aekanut Jalearpon - street magician
- Jeff Leong – magician
- Sobhi Shaker – magician
- The Annoying Brothers – comic juggler duo
- The Makchicks – singing trio
- Angela July – singer/harpist
- Noah Velasco - crystal ball performer
- Swan Team - hiphop dance group
- Chiang Sui-Ying - street acrobatic performer
- Regina Aurellia Utami – traditional dancer
- Sumit Sadawarti – singer/keyboardist
- Manit Chabutchin – extreme performer
- The Next Eclipse – contortionists/contemporary dance group
- Leonardo Hsu - singer/guitarist
- Jane Callista – singer/tap dancer
- Feng E – electric ukuleleist
- Neil Rey Garcia Llanes – beatboxer
NOTE: Please be guided that the successful auditionees are listed according to their order of appearance. Golden acts are italicized. This list contains the aired auditions only.

== Semifinals ==
The deliberation round was also held at the Pinewood Iskandar Malaysia Studios in Johor, Malaysia, as opposed to the previous season where it was held at the Marina Bay Sands. It was shown at end of the final auditions episode on November 9, 2017. During the entire auditions, 99 acts received at least 2 yeses from the judges. The judges then chose the 20 remaining acts who would compete in semi-finals. The four Golden Acts and the judges' picks would bring the total number of semifinalists to 24. The first eight semifinalists was announced after the deliberation round, with the others to be revealed gradually as the semifinal rounds progress.

The semifinal rounds were also taped at the same studio as the judges' auditions. In the previous season, it was held at the Marina Bay Sands.

For the first time in Got Talent franchise history, this season makes use of completely online voting methods. The audience may vote through hashtags on Facebook, Messenger, and Google search. A maximum of 10 votes per method per day is implemented.

Facebook

- Each act is assigned an official unique voting hashtag during the semifinal. The viewer must create Facebook post with the hashtag of the act. Comments on third party Facebook pages are also counted. A post or comment with more than one official hashtag (whether the same or different) renders the vote invalid.

Messenger

- The viewer must search for Asia's Got Talent on Facebook Messenger. A photo carousel will appear with the pictures of the week's semifinalists. Click the picture to vote.

Google Search

- The user must have a Google account first. The phrase "Asia's Got Talent vote" must be typed on the search box. The photos of the week's acts will appear. Click the photo to choose the act. The slider on the right assigns 1 to 10 votes for that act.

This season of Asia's Got Talent uses a completely online voting, as compared to other Got Talent franchises where SMS votes are available. The revelation of results is slightly different, being revealed in the following week rather than the next night (as semifinal rounds are only once weekly, barring replays). The Golden Buzzer last season was replaced by the Judges' Pick, although its mechanics is the same where the judges would come to a unanimous decision to send one act straight to the finals. This is similar to the Judges' Choice in the other local franchises, albeit one ahead of the vote rather than after and based on the vote. Aside from the Judges' Pick, the two acts with the most public votes would also advance to the finals. There would thus be a total of nine finalists emerging from the three semifinal rounds.

Ages listed are as of the time of the auditions. In the case of group acts, the age ranges only accounted for the members present at the auditions. The age(s) of any additional member(s) who only appeared in the semifinal may or may not be within the range designated.

- Winner
- Runner-up
- Third place
- Fourth place
- Middle two
- Bottom three
- Golden Buzzer
- Judges' Pick

Name of act	Age(s)	Genre	Act	Hometown	Semifinal Week	Result
The Sacred Riana	25	Magic	Illusionist	Indonesia	2	Winner
DM-X Comvaleñoz	19–28	Dance	Dance Group	Philippines	2	Runner-up
Neil Rey Garcia Llanes	21	Music	Beatboxer	Philippines	1	Third place
Canion Shijirbat	26	Dance	Dancer	Mongolia	1	Fourth Place
ADEM Dance Crew	16–23	Dance	Dance Group	Kyrgyzstan	2	Middle two
Sobhi Shaker	24	Magic	Magician	Malaysia (Syria)	3	Middle two
Angela July	30	Singing	Singer	Indonesia	1	Bottom three
Feng E	10	Music	Ukulele Player	Taiwan	3	Bottom three
Urban Crew	22–28	Dance	Dance Group	Philippines	3	Bottom three
218 Dance Crew	20–31	Dance	Dance Group	Vietnam	2	Eliminated
Akira Kimura	36	Magic	Magician	Japan	3	Eliminated
Andrew Lee	31	Magic	Magician	Malaysia	1	Eliminated
Deniel Sarmiento	17	Dance	Dancer	Philippines	1	Eliminated
Ekklesia	28–34	Singing	Opera Trio	South Korea	1	Eliminated
Fitri Cerado	14	Singing	Singer	Philippines	2	Eliminated
Krittaya Ariyasit	10	Acrobatics	Aeralist	Thailand	3	Eliminated
Mafarikha Akhir	25	Singing	Singer	Malaysia	2	Eliminated
Power Storm Crew	20–35	Dance	Dance Group	Thailand	1	Eliminated
The Sisters	10 & 12	Singing	Opera Duo	Singapore	1	Eliminated
Sumit Sadawarti	22	Singing	Singer	India	3	Eliminated
Syah Riszuan	12	Singing	Singer	Singapore	2	Eliminated
Viriya Rici	11	Dance	Dancer	Indonesia	3	Eliminated
XTRAP	28–33	Dance	Dance Group	Japan	2	Eliminated
Yumbo Dump	31 & 33	Comedy	Comedy Duo	Japan	3	Eliminated

Notes

1. Akira is a native Japanese but has been living in Indonesia for two and a half years.
2. Sobhi is currently settled in Malaysia after escaping from the Syrian Civil War.

=== Semifinals summary ===
- Buzzed out
- Judges' Pick
- Won judges' pick and advanced to the finals
- Won public vote and advanced to the finals

==== Semifinals 1 (November 16) ====
Act	Order	Performance description	Buzzes			Result
Act	Order	Performance description	Foster	Anggun	Park	Result
Power Storm Crew	1	Did a dance performance inspired by the Minion jail scene from the Despicable Me 3 film.				Eliminated
Angela July	2	Sang "Chandelier" by Sia.				Advanced
Andrew Lee	3	Had Anggun handle a coin (with her initials written) inside her hand which he magically bent while still inside Anggun's hand. He then had Foster handle a copy of The Invisible Man by H. G. Wells and, while he and Foster faced away from each other, correctly guessed a passage Foster was looking at a particular page and paragraph. Lee also had his "copy" of the book, one with blank pages.				Eliminated
Deniel Sarmiento	4	Did a routine, which included moving around on a dangling hoop, to the music of "Lost Boy" by Ruth B.				Eliminated
The Sisters	5	Sang "You Raise Me Up" by Secret Garden, accompanied by an eight-person choir.				Eliminated
Neil Rey Garcia Llanes	6	Did two original compositions, the second of which was an amalgam of seven different sounds, one more than those in his audition piece.				Advanced
Ekklesia	7	Sang "La donna è mobile" from Giuseppe Verdi's opera Rigoletto.				Eliminated
Canion Shijirbat	8	Did a dance and fantasy routine where he played a medieval soldier in metal armor.				Advanced

==== Semifinals 2 (November 23) ====
Act	Order	Performance description	Buzzes			Result
Act	Order	Performance description	Foster	Anggun	Park	Result
ADEM Dance Crew	1	Performed a routine based on the Night at the Museum film and its sequels.				Advanced
Mafarikha Akhir	2	Sang "Ain't No Mountain High Enough" by Marvin Gaye and Tammi Terrell.				Eliminated
The Sacred Riana	3	Performed a combined routine consisting of a séance, a self-writing chalkboard, and a haunted dollhouse illusion which produced a similar-looking "friend."				Advanced
Fitri Cerado	4	Sang "Angels Brought Me Here" by Guy Sebastian.				Eliminated
218 Dance Crew	5	Did an electronic dance and breakdance routine with illuminated áo dài, folding fans, and nón lá, culminating to the formation of an illuminated lotus flower.				Eliminated
Syah Riszuan	6	Sang "I'll Be There" by The Jackson 5.				Eliminated
XTRAP	7	Formed a series of geometric shapes, patterns, and synchronized movements with their hands on an illuminated table as shown by an overhead camera to the music of "Into the Sunset" by Jeremy Abbott and Louise Dowd.				Eliminated
DM-X Comvaleñoz	8	Did a dance routine which started with a haka-like original dance, followed by various stunts and acrobatics backed by heavy metal music, then switched to a more feminine dance routine to the tune of "Free Your Mind" by En Vogue before going back to more stunts and acrobatics to finish their performance.				Advanced

==== Semifinals 3 (November 30) ====
Act	Order	Performance description	Buzzes			Result
Act	Order	Performance description	Foster	Anggun	Park	Result
Yumbo Dump	1	Used objects from their sack to make improvised sounds of a whale giving birth, an owl in a silent forest, and fish splashing around a boat, all while wearing only mawashi inside a sumo ring.				Eliminated
Viriya Rici	2	Did a routine which start with popping dance while waking up from bed, then did a breakdancing routine, which included ball tricks, to the music of "24K Magic" by Bruno Mars.				Eliminated
Feng E	3	Performed a rendition of "Viva la Vida" by Coldplay on electric ukulele.				Advanced
Krittaya Ariyasit	4	Performed an underwater world-themed routine.				Eliminated
Akira Kimura	5	Did a series of magic tricks with their secrets revealing spontaneously by himself or unwittingly by stage hands for laughs. Among the tricks were a coin disappearing under a glass, a color changing shuttlecock, producing objects from inside a hollow cylinder, teleportation, and a female assistant quickly changing her wardrobe.				Eliminated
Sumit Sadawarti	6	Sang the jazz standard "I Only Have Eyes for You" from the Dames film.				Eliminated
Sobhi Shaker	7	Performed card magic. He separated the aces from the deck and teleported them from one place to another, then transformed the aces into queens with the aces reappearing from inside the box. The other cards had their backs changed from red to blue with the aces and queens' backs changing color as well. The other cards then became blank. The aces and queens and some blank cards became pictures of the three judges, two hands, a globe, and the message "#StopAllWar"; the rest of the cards then formed the words of the name of the show.				Advanced
Urban Crew	8	Did a ninja-themed dance, stunts, and breakdancing routine.				Advanced

Note

1. Foster pressed his buzzer during Yumbo Dump's performance, but removed it afterwards during his comment after he admittedly was being heavily entertained by the latter half of the performance.

== Finals ==
The finals, like the previous season, were held at the Marina Bay Sands, Singapore, over a span of two episodes, a performance night and a results night.

On the results night, David Foster, on piano, played "Love Theme from St. Elmo's Fire", a song from the St. Elmo's Fire film. Anggun sang "What We Remember", a single from her latest album "8". Lastly, Jay Park, together with Yultron, debuted their newest song "Forget About Tomorrow".

- Winner
- Runner-up
- Third place
- Fourth place
- Middle two
- Bottom three
- Auditions Golden Buzzer
- Semifinals Judges' Pick

Act	Order	Performance description	Result
Urban Crew	1	Did a multi-track urban area-themed dance, stunts, and breakdancing routine.	Bottom three
Angela July	2	Sang "Skyfall" (from the James Bond film with the same name) by Adele.	Bottom three
Canion Shijirbat	3	Did a dance routine involving orbs of light and multiple dopplegängers, ending with a marriage proposal for his wife.	Fourth place
The Sacred Riana	4	First performed close-up magic by transferring a pentagram drawn on a burning piece of paper onto the back of Anggun's right hand with ashes, then made several ghouls appear from inside a box on the stage. She then hid inside the box to escape from the ghouls, disappearing from within and magically reappearing behind the judges.	Winner
Sobhi Shaker	5	Performed card magic using several blank cards, forming words and pictographs and hearts on them, ripping one card labeled "Dream," making it whole again, and disintegrating it into dust over the heart cards, with their backs forming a picture of his from earlier in the performance, all illustrating the realities of life, the destruction caused by war, and the rise of love and hope amidst them.	Middle Two
Neil Rey Garcia Llanes	6	First acted as a DJ who experienced technical difficulties, then did a mashup composition which included "Uptown Funk" by Mark Ronson and Bruno Mars, an original composition which was an amalgam of ten different sounds, and finally a composition using all sounds from his previous performances.	Third Place
ADEM Dance Crew	7	Did a routine where they acted as robots in a metal steampunk world. One was left out on the rain after picking up a flower bud, then found itself making smooth dance moves as opposed to rigid ones earlier before finally conking out as a rose grew amongst the metal. The background musical score included the chorus of the song "Secrets" by OneRepublic.	Middle Two
Feng E	8	Performed "Beautiful Day" by U2 with both acoustic guitar and electric ukulele.	Bottom three
DM-X Comvaleñoz	9	The group entered the stage in a fashion show-like manner, followed up with various stunts and acrobatics backed by heavy metal music (mostly parts of "One Step Closer" by Linkin Park), then switched to a feminine dance routine to the tune of "Despacito" by Luis Fonsi and Daddy Yankee with funny group poses in between sets of steps before finishing with more stunts and acrobatics.	Runner-up

== Contestants who appeared on previous shows or seasons ==
- ADEM Dance Crew was a finalist on the sixth season of Česko Slovensko Má Talent. They also received a golden buzzer during the auditions.
- Akira Kimura, who himself has been living in Indonesia for two and a half years prior to auditioning for the show, previously appeared in an Indonesian talent search show Go Show in which he managed to reach the semifinals.
- Canion Shijirbat appeared in the second season of Mongolia's Got Talent, where he placed second. He also competed in the twelfth season of America's Got Talent, only to be eliminated during the Judge Cuts. His audition in this season occurred a few months after his Judge Cuts performance and a few weeks after said performance was aired in the United States.
- Power Storm was a finalist on the third season of Thailand's Got Talent. Three years later, they finished as a semifinalist on the sixth season of the same show.
- Deniel Sarmiento was a semifinalist on the fifth season of Pilipinas Got Talent.
- D' Intensity Breakers placed fifth on the fourth season of the local Got Talent franchise of the Philippines, Pilipinas Got Talent. Afterwards, they appeared on the first season of Asia's Got Talent, getting four yeses but weren't chosen by the judges to advance to the semifinals.
- Deenormous took part in the previous season where he received 4 buzzers and 4 nos.
- Neil Rey Garcia Llanes was a contestant in the previous season. He got 4 yeses and was chosen by the judges to advance to the semifinals but he has withdrawn from the competition and let go his semi final spot to finish his studies.
- DM-X Comvaleñoz was a semifinalist on the fifth season of Pilipinas Got Talent.
- Mercifuletes Viola, D'Gemini, and Urban Crew joined the fifth season of Pilipinas Got Talent.
- Garrett Bolden Jr. also joined Pilipinas Got Talent and became semifinalist.
- Fitri Cerado also auditioned on the first season of the show.
- Jayvee and Bjorn Mendoza, as a duo, joined the Philippine franchise of La Banda, Pinoy Boyband Superstar. They were eliminated in the Performance Night of the Middle Rounds.
- Yumbo Dump appeared in several variety shows in their home country, starting with the show "Pu"-sama 100%ALL NATURAL KUSANAGI&YUSUKE in 2011. They also appeared in the Tamil film Jilla.
- Little K-Tigers performed on Mnet's Hit The Stage, a South Korean dance survival contest.
- Louis Choi appeared on the fourth season of the Korean game show I Can See Your Voice.
- The Juans, who appeared on Episode 4, is a Filipino boy band whose cover of Balisong, originally sang by Rivermaya, was used as the soundtrack of the hit Filipino film 100 Tula Para Kay Stella.
- Angel Tornado was a finalist on the sixth season of Thailand's Got Talent.
- Meowfie is an internet meowing sensation. He also have appeared on several films and TV shows.
- Krittaya Ariyasit also appeared on the sixth season of Thailand's Got Talent and reached the semifinals.
- The Sacred Riana was a finalist on Indonesian magician talent search show, The Next Mentalist, where she became a runner-up.
- Jane Callista joined the first season of The Voice Kids Indonesia but eliminated on Live Shows round 1.
- Viriya Rici appeared on the third season of Indonesia Mencari Bakat, an Indonesian talent search show similar to the Got Talent franchise of Indonesia, Indonesia's Got Talent, and reached the semifinals.
- Angela July joined the second season of X Factor Indonesia and finished seventh.
- Noah Velasco is a part of The Velasco Brothers, a semifinalist in the previous season.
- Bikoon! has appeared in many TV shows in Japan since 2001, one of them being the variety show All That's Manzai. Shiro Maeda, the shorter of the duo hidden inside the black bag at the start of the duo's audition, appeared separately in two other variety shows, Lincoln and Ima-chan no "Jitsu wa...".
- Quinn Calista Masongsong competed in Tawag ng Tanghalan Kids, a singing competition within the variety show, It's Showtime. There, she was a one-day champion, losing her title the next day.
