= Indonesia's Got Talent season 4 =

Indonesia's Got Talent
- Season 4
- Presented by: Robby Purba
- Judges: Ivan Gunawan; Reza Oktovian; Rossa; Denny Sumargo
- Winner: Femme Fatale
- Runner-up: Darak Badarak
- Location: Jakarta Concert Hall, iNews Tower, Jakarta (Audition - Grand Finals)

Release
- Original network: RCTI
- Original release: 11 June – 14 August 2023

Season chronology
- ← Previous; Season 3

In January 2023, Fremantle and RCTI announce that the season 4 will be launch in 2023. The Fourth season of the talent show competition series Indonesia's Got Talent premiered on RCTI on 11 June 2023, and concluded on 14 August 2023. With Robby Purba will be continue his presenting role, and the four judges will be continuing their judging role.

Femme Fatale, as a dancers-magician group are the winner of Indonesia's Got Talent for this seasons. The winner will be granted Rp150.000.000,-.

== Host, Judges, and Guest Star ==
=== Host ===
- Robby Purba

=== Judges ===
- Ivan Gunawan
- Reza Oktovian
- Rossa
- Denny Sumargo

=== Guest Judges ===
- David Bayu
- Judika
- Maia Estianty

=== Guest Star ===
- Putri Ariani
- Salma Salsabil
- Nabila Taqiyyah
- Rony Parulian
- Nyoman Paul
- Raisa Syarla
- Rahman Sadli
- Demian Aditya
- Gloria Jessica
- Marion Jola
- Novia Bachmid
- Pasheman'90
- Fritzy Rosmerian
- Eternals
- Ryu Lawden
- Ale Funky
- Hookha

== Sponsor ==
=== Main Sponsors ===
- Mie Sedaap

=== TV Sponsors ===
- Pantene
- Vision+
- MotionPay
- Yamaha Gear 125

=== YouTube Sponsors ===
- Teh Kotak
- Kopi ABC
- Sun Life
- Philips

== Season overview ==
=== Golden Buzzer ===
The following are the winners of the "Golden Buzzer" chosen by the four judges:

Judges
Ivan	Reza	Rossa	Denny	Group Golden Buzzer
Bravery; Dancer Group	I. D. Melody; Broadway Singer	Budi Utama; Music Group	Gita Handayani; Drum Band	Bala Bali; Dancer Group

=== Results ===
Below is a list of the overall results of each participant's appearance in this season:

The Winner | Runner Up | 3rd Place | Grand Finalist | Finalist | Semi-finalist | Quarter-finalist
"Golden Buzzer" Audition

Participant	Age	From	Act	Quarter-final	Result
Adhis Christian	19	Kupang	Traditional Dancer	3	Quarter-finalist
Adryan Natha	24	Bali	Ventriloquist	3	Finalist
Arwini Eka Puspitasari	18	Makassar	Singer	3	Quarter-finalist
Bala Bali	15-21	Bali	Dancer Group	Semi-finalist	Semi-finalist
Bratayudha	16-18	Subang	Marching Troops	1	Semi-finalist
Bravery	20-23	Yogyakarta	Dancer Group	Semi-finalist	Finalist
Budi Utama	16-19	Yogyakarta	Traditional Music Group	Semi-finalist	Semi-finalist
Cakra Barani	34	Makassar	Guitarist	1	Quarter-finalist
Chronicles	15-18	Bandung	Dancer Group	3	Semi-finalist
D'Elite	22	Makassar	Rapper	3	Quarter-finalist
Dance Generation	15-31	Bali	Dancer Group	1	Quarter-finalist
Darak Badarak	10-32	Pariaman	Music Group	1	Runner Up
Elizabeth	18	Surabaya	Rapper	3	Quarter-finalist
Elly Rahmawati	19	Malang	Beatboxer	3	Quarter-finalist
Ennea Troops	15-18	Yogyakarta	Dancer Group	1	Quarter-finalist
Fatamorgana	22-28	Manado	Dancer Group	1	Semi-finalist
Femme Fatale	20-23	Jakarta	Magic-Dancer Group	2	The Winners
Funky Soul	11 & 12	Surabaya	Dancer Group	3	Quarter-finalist
Gita Handayani	13-17	Aceh	Marching Band	Semi-finalist	Grand Finalist
GODisLOVE Dancer	19-31	Ambon	Dancer Group	1	Quarter-finalist
Hero Band	8-12	Ponorogo	Group Band	2	Quarter-finalist
I. D. Melody	12	Jakarta	Broadway Singer	Semi-finalist	Semi-finalist
Ipulogi & Gatotkece	34	Tegal	Ventriloquist	2	Quarter-finalist
Jacky Sembiring	30	Medan	Traditional Music Player	3	Quarter-finalist
Joharini	19-26	Yogyakarta	Music Group	2	Quarter-finalist
Jean Mind	32	Venezuela	Magician	1	Finalist
Kevin Leon	15	Mataram	Saxophone Player	1	Finalist
Komunal Primitif Percussion	17-27	Medan	Music Group	3	Semi-finalist
L.A Maizan Star	9-11	Yogyakarta	Singer Group	2	Quarter-finalist
LAS	15-35	Bekasi	Dancer Group	2	Quarter-finalist
Lay Lay	29	Taiwan	Diabolo Attraction	2	Quarter-finalist
Lima Pandawa	14-16	Jakarta	Traditional Dancer Group	3	Finalist
Major 9	20-27	Manado	Traditional Music Group	2	3rd Place
Marissa Sutanto	28	Bandung	Musician	2	Quarter-finalist
Michelle Tan	18	Purwodadi	Drummer	1	Quarter-finalist
Miracle Dancers Family	9-28	Lombok	Dancer Group	1	Quarter-finalist
Pradipta	27	Salatiga	Puppet Player	2	Quarter-finalist
Princess Alice	14	Yogyakarta	Singer	3	Quarter-finalist
Sandi	20	Tangerang	Dubber	1	Quarter-finalist
Steps Squad	17-27	Jakarta	Dancer Group	2	Quarter-finalist
Sumringah	9-12	Yogyakarta	Traditional Music Group	3	Quarter-finalist
Tandang Makalang	17 & 18	Karawang	Acrobatic	3	Quarter-finalist
Thalia Sharon	24	Jakarta	Singer	3	Semi-finalist
The Lil Bounce	11-18	Yogyakarta	Dancer Group	2	Quarter-finalist
Toxic Girls	16-22	Bandung	Dancer Group	2	Grand Finalist
Valiandre	37	Solo	Magician	2	Semi-finalist
Wingit	21-29	Yogyakarta	Music Group	3	Quarter-finalist
Zaitun Voice	35-62	Bitung	Singer and Dancer Group	1	Semi-finalist
