= Indonesia's Got Talent season 3 =

Indonesia's Got Talent
- Season 3
- Presented by: Robby Purba
- Judges: Ivan Gunawan; Reza Oktovian; Rossa; Denny Sumargo
- Winner: Pasheman'90
- Runner-up: Cassidy Lee
- Location: Jakarta Concert Hall, iNews Tower, Jakarta (Audition - Grand Finals)

Release
- Original network: RCTI
- Original release: 8 August – 3 October 2022

Season chronology
- ← Previous; Season 2 Next → Season 4

The third season of the talent show competition series Indonesia's Got Talent premiered on RCTI on 8 August 2022, and concluded on 3 October 2022. This show is also the first IGT season to be broadcast on a television station under MNC Media, namely RCTI after the previous two seasons aired on 2 television stations under the auspices of Emtek (SCM), namely Indosiar in 2010 and SCTV in 2014.

Pasheman'90 are the winner of Indonesia's Got Talent for this appearance. It marks the first win by variety talent on this appearance, after the two first appearances that were won by singers. They will be granted IDR 150.000.000,- and 1 Car Unit Hyundai Stargazer.

== Host, judges & guest star ==
In this season, all host and judges are different from the last 2 seasons.

=== Host ===
- Robby Purba

=== Judges ===
- Ivan Gunawan
- Reza Oktovian
- Rossa
- Denny Sumargo

=== Guest judges ===
- Armand Maulana
- Ariel Noah
- Raline Shah

=== Guest star ===
- 2nd Chance
- Ray Prasetya
- Ade Kurniawan
- Fara Shakila
- Rimar Callista
- Eric Chien
- The Sacred Riana
- Kyuhyun

== Sponsor ==
=== Main sponsors ===
- Mie Sedaap
- Hyundai Stargazer

=== Television sponsors ===
- Tolak Angin
- Sidomuncul Vitamin C 1000 mg
- Vision+
- Motion Pay
- Motion Life
- Trebel Music
- Prime Video
- Spotify
- Aladdin Mall
- Komix Herbal
- Kapal Api
- Viva Cosmetics

=== YouTube sponsors ===
- Tokopedia
- Teh Kotak

== Season overview ==
=== Golden Buzzer ===
The following are the winners of the "Golden Buzzer" chosen by the four judges:

Judges
Ivan	Reza	Rossa	Denny
Cassidy Lee; Magician	WeHustle; Dance Group	Revell Ady Johnavan; Drummer	Rionaldo Halir; Drummer

=== Results ===
Below is a list of the overall results of each participant's appearance in this season:

The Winner | Runner Up | 3rd Place | Grand Finalist | Finalist | Semi-finalist | Quarter-finalist
"Golden Buzzer" Audition

Participant	Age	From	Act	Quarter-final	Result
1Legacy	16–31	Bandung	Dance Group	2	Finalist
Aaron Nathanael	18	Jakarta	Magician	2	Finalist
Aku Badut Indonesia (ABI)	42 & 53	Bekasi	Clown Performer	2	Quarter-finalist
Ale Funky	30	Bogor	Guitarist	1	Quarter-finalist
Alif Fakod	23	Kutai Kartanegara	Traditional Musical Instrument Player	1	Semi-finalist
Aray Vandiamond	24	Yogyakarta	Magician	2	Quarter-finalist
Bali Circus Academy	6–11	Bali	Aerialist	2	Quarter-finalist
Brian Luzenora	10	Surabaya	Broadway Singer	2	Quarter-finalist
Cassidy Lee	31	Batam	Magician	Semi-finalist	Runner Up
Edsel Prince	9	Magelang	Rapper	2	Quarter-finalist
Eternals	19–31	Bandung	Dance Group	1	Grand Finalist
Ferdiansyah	21	Jakarta	Poem Reader	2	Quarter-finalist
Follow Art	31 & 39	Bali	Aerialist	2	Semi-finalist
Fritzy Rosmerian	13	Jakarta	Magician	1	Grand Finalist
Geraldine Laura Vianne	9	Surabaya	Pianist	2	Finalist
Holly Ballay	34	Jakarta	Magicomic	1	Finalist
Hookha (Rafly)	23	Bandar Lampung	Beatboxer	2	Semi-finalist
Jakarta Youth Choir	20–28	Jakarta	Choir	1	Semi-finalist
Jemmy Dance Academy (JDA)	18-20	Kupang	Traditional Musical Instrument Player	2	Semi-finalist
Jerry Piko	44	Surabaya	Bubbleologist	2	Quarter-finalist
Julfen Babawat	28	Manado	Singer	2	Quarter-finalist
LasermanX Bali	26	Bali	Laser Dance	2	Semi-finalist
My Stylez Kids	8–12	Bandung	Kids Dance Group	2	Quarter-finalist
N Lions	19–23	Bogor	Taekwondo	1	3rd Place
Nabila	23	Surabaya	Singer	2	Quarter-finalist
Naluri Manca	19–24	Bali	Dance Group	1	Quarter-finalist
Pasheman'90	17–20	Garut	Marching Troops	2	The Winner
Revel Ady Johnavan	12	Tangerang	Drummers	Semi-finalist	Semi-finalist
Rionaldo Halir	30	Manado	Drummers	Semi-finalist	Semi-finalist
Rizdal Hady	32	Gowa	Magician	1	Quarter-finalist
Rocky Oktori	22	Jakarta	Magician	1	Semi-finalist
Ryu Lawden	13	Medan	Pianist	1	Quarter-finalist
Son of Garuda	24–26	Padang, Makassar, Indramayu	Beatboxer	2	Quarter-finalist
Sultoni (Kak Tony)	40	Jakarta	Ventriloquist	1	Semi-finalist
The Avengirls	18–21	Bandung	Dance Group	1	Quarter-finalist
Violet	23–25	Surabaya	Violinist & Dancer	1	Quarter-finalist
Vladd	18 & 28	Jakarta	Dancer	1	Quarter-finalist
We Hustle	23–29	Jakarta	Dance Group	Semi-finalist	Finalist
Yudi	33	Bondowoso	Acrobatics	1	Quarter-finalist
Yusten Bentar Kaesman	33	Kupang	Singer	2	Semi-finalist
Zafira Ramadhani	13	Balikpapan	Traditional & Modern Dancer	2	Semi-finalist

=== Quarter-finals summary ===
Buzzed Out
Advanced to Semi-finals

==== Quarter-final 1 (September 12) ====
Quarter-Finalist	Order	Buzzes and Judges' votes				Result
Quarter-Finalist	Order	Ivan	Reza	Rossa	Denny	Result
N Lions	1					Advance to semi-final
Ryu Lawden	2					Eliminated
Fritzy Rosmerian	3					Advance to semi-final
Ale Funky	4					Eliminated
Rocky Oktori	5					Advance to semi-final
The Avengirls	6					Eliminated
Vladd	7					Eliminated
Eternals	8					Advance to semi-final
Holly Ballay	9					Advance to semi-final
Yudi	10					Eliminated
Rizdal Hady	11					Eliminated
Alif Fakod	12					Advance to semi-final
Violet	13					Eliminated
Jakarta Youth Choir	14					Advance to semi-final
Naluri Manca	15					Eliminated
Sultoni	16					Advance to semi-final

==== Quarter-final 2 (September 13) ====
Quarter-Finalist	Order	Buzzes and Judges' votes				Result
Quarter-Finalist	Order	Ivan	Reza	Rossa	Denny	Result
Pasheman'90	1					Advance to semi-final
Brian Luzenora	2					Eliminated
Edsel Prince	3					Eliminated
Geraldine Laura Vianne	4					Advance to semi-final
Aku Badut Indonesia (ABI)	5					Eliminated
Aaron Nathanael	6					Advance to semi-final
Aray Vandiamond	7					Eliminated
Son Of Garuda	8					Eliminated
Hookha	9					Advance to semi-final
Nabila	10					Eliminated
Julfen Babawat	11					Eliminated
Ferdiansyah	12					Eliminated
Jerry Piko	13					Eliminated
LasermanX Bali	14					Advance to semi-final
1Legacy	15					Advance to semi-final
Yusten Bentar Kaesman	16					Advance to semi-final
Follow Art	17					Advance to semi-final
Bali Circus Academy	18					Eliminated
My Style Kids	19					Eliminated
Zafira Ramadhani	20					Advance to semi-final
Jemmy Dance Academy	21					Advance to semi-final

=== Semi-finals summary ===
Buzzed Out
Advanced to Semi-finals

==== Semi-final (September 19) ====
Guest Performer: 2nd Chance, Ray Prasetya & Ade Kurniawan

Quarter-Finalist	Order	Buzzes and Judges' votes				Result
Quarter-Finalist	Order	Ivan	Reza	Rossa	Denny	Result
Pasheman'90	1					Advance to Final
Holly Ballay	2					Advance to Final
N Lions	3					Advance to Final
Cassidy Lee	4					Advance to Final
Geraldine Laura Vianne	5					Advance to Final
Hookha	6					Eliminated
LasermanX Bali	7					Eliminated
Eternals	8					Advance to Final
Fritzy Rosmerian	9					Advance to Final
Sultoni	10					Eliminated
Rocky Oktori	11					Eliminated
Yusten Bentar Kausman	12					Eliminated
Jakarta Youth Choir	13					Eliminated
1Legacy	14					Advance to Final
Aaron Nathanael	15					Advance to Final
Zafira Ramadhani	16					Eliminated
Alif Fakod	17					Eliminated
Jemmy Dance Academy	18					Eliminated
Rionaldo Halir	19					Eliminated
Revell Ady Johnavan	20					Eliminated
We Hustle	21					Advance to Final
Follow Art ^{1}	22					Eliminated

- ^1 To respect for this participant, the appearance was not published due to an accident during tapping session.

=== Finals Summary (September 27 & October 3) ===
Guest Performer, Grand Final: Eric Chien and Kyuhyun

Winner | Runner-up | 3rd place | Top 5

Finalist	Performed with (Road to Grand Final)	Performed with (Grand Final)	Result (October 3)
Pasheman'90	N/A	N/A	1st
Fritzy Rosmerian	N/A	The Sacred Riana	Grand-finalist
N Lions	N/A	N/A	3rd
Aaron Nathanael	Fara Shakila	N/A	Finalist
Geraldine Laura Vianne	Rimar Callista	N/A	Finalist
Cassidy Lee	N/A	Eric Chien	2nd
Holly Ballay	N/A	N/A	Finalist
We Hustle	N/A	N/A	Finalist
1Legacy	N/A	N/A	Finalist
Eternals	N/A	N/A	Grand-finalist
