= Indonesia's Got Talent season 1 =

Indonesia's Got Talent
- Season 1
- Presented by: Tora Sudiro; Vincent Rompies
- Judges: Vina Panduwinata; Anjasmara; Ria Irawan
- Winner: Vania Larissa
- Runner-up: Young Boys
- Location: Teater Tanah Airku, TMII, Jakarta (Audition); Studio 5 Indosiar, Jakarta (Semifinals, and Finals)

Release
- Original network: Indosiar
- Original release: July 23 – December 25, 2010

Season chronology
- Next → Season 2

Indonesia's Got Talent (season 1) or Indonesia's Got Talent 2010 is the first season of the talent show Indonesia's Got Talent. Initially this program had been designed and prepared in 2008 to be broadcast on Indosiar. However, in reality this program was finally launched in mid-2010.

== Host & Judges ==
=== Host ===
- Tora Sudiro
- Vincent Rompies

=== Judges ===
- Vina Panduwinata
- Anjasmara
- Ria Irawan

== Sponsor ==
- Kuku Bima Ener-G

== Season overview ==
=== Top 56 (Semi-finals) ===
The semi-finals began on September 25, 2010. Eight acts performed each week. A three-hour performance episode each Saturday was followed by an also three hour results show on Sunday, where four of the eight acts from the previous night remained in the competition. The judges' choice remained, as the judges got to decide whether the contestant who placed either in fourth or fifth place got to advance to the next round.

==== Elimination table, Week 1 ====
The performance episode aired on September 25, 2010. The results episode aired on September 26, 2010.

Note
Buzzed out
Judges' choice
Advanced to the Top 28.
Finished in either fourth or fifth place; Won the judges' vote.
Finished in either fourth or fifth place; Lost the judges' vote.

Order	Performer	Act Description	Buzzes and Judges' Choices		
Order	Performer	Act Description	Vina	Anjas	Ria
1	Diwantara Anugrah Putra (Tara)	Opera Singer	—	—	—
2	Elnoe Budiman	3-year-old Drummer	—	—	—
3	Fajar Desmana (Ajay)	Dancer	—	—	—
4	Capoeira Bali Mixing	Dancer Group	—	—	—
5	Lucky Family Band	Band Group			—
6	(1st) Young Boys	Musician Group	—	—	—
7	Vivi Nur Afiah	Singer/Comedian	—	—	
8	Waysy	Animal Action	—	—	—

==== Elimination Table, Week 2 ====
The performance episode aired on October 2, 2010. The results episode aired on October 3, 2010.

Note
Buzzed out
Judges' choice
Advanced to the Top 28.
Finished in either fourth or fifth place; Won the judges' vote.
Finished in either fourth or fifth place; Lost the judges' vote.

Order	Performer	Act Description	Buzzes and Judges' Choices		
Order	Performer	Act Description	Vina	Anjas	Ria
1	Surabaya Kedjang	Breakdancer Group	—	—	—
2	Edwin Putra Mulyono	Pianist	—	—	—
3	The Waled	Extreme Magic	—		
4	D'Geprax	Recycle Percussion Group	—	—	—
5	Raditya Adi Pramono	Ventriloquist		—	
6	Melis Guraici	Pop Singer	—	—	—
7	Ramlan Manuhurung	Dancer/Comedian	—		
8	(1st) Heni Chandra	Blind Singer/Guitarist	—	—	—

==== Elimination Table, Week 3 ====
The performance episode aired on October 9, 2010. The results episode aired on October 10, 2010.

Note
Buzzed out
Judges' choice
Advanced to the Top 28.
Finished in either fourth or fifth place; Won the judges' vote.
Finished in either fourth or fifth place; Lost the judges' vote.

Order	Performer	Act Description	Buzzes and Judges' Choices		
Order	Performer	Act Description	Vina	Anjas	Ria
1	Victoria Felice	Falsetto Singer		—	—
2	Abdul Muhaimmin	Ventriloquist/Magician	—		
3	Pragina Gong	Traditional & Modern Mixes Dancer Group	—		
4	(1st) Melita Meliala	Singer/Guitarist	—	—	—
5	Bogie Papeda	Popping Dancer	—	—	—
6	Rifky Ardiansyah	Violinist	—	—	—
7	Akademi Wushu Indonesia	Martial Arts Group	—	—	—
8	Deky Rulian	Falsetto Singer	—	—	—

==== Elimination Table, Week 4 ====
The performance episode aired on October 16, 2010. The results episode aired on October 17, 2010.

Note
Buzzed out
Judges' choice
Advanced to the Top 28.
Finished in either fourth or fifth place; Won the judges' vote.
Finished in either fourth or fifth place; Lost the judges' vote.

Italics indicate the act was a wild card.

Order	Performer	Act Description	Buzzes and Judges' Choices		
Order	Performer	Act Description	Vina	Anjas	Ria
1	Regia Rahadini	Traditional/Pop Singer	—		
2	Banzai Drum Corps	Percussion Group	—	—	—
3	Boni Avibus	Orator/Poet		—	—
4	Deden Hidayat	Rock Singer	—	—	—
5	(1st) Munik	Duo Beat Armpit/Comedian	—	—	—
6	Sepimas	Traditional Dancer Group	—	—	—
7	Pasuma Voices	Choir	—	—	—
8	Hernawan Eko	Opera Singer	—	—	—

==== Elimination Table, Week 5 ====
The performance episode aired on October 23, 2010. The results episode aired on October 24, 2010.

Note
Buzzed out
Judges' choice
Advanced to the Top 28.
Finished in either fourth or fifth place; Won the judges' vote.
Finished in either fourth or fifth place; Lost the judges' vote.

Order	Performer	Act Description	Buzzes and Judges' Choices		
Order	Performer	Act Description	Vina	Anjas	Ria
1	Murianto A.S	Yoyo Tricker	—	—	—
2	The Brothers	Opera Singer Group	—	—	—
3	(1st) Daud	Singer/Guitarist	—	—	—
4	Rama Dimasatria	Card Flourisher	—	—	
5	Ida Ayu Rasthiti	Traditional Dancer/Ballerina			—
6	To The Point	Dance Troupe	—	—	—
7	Cecep Rahman	Heavy Metal Singer	—		—
8	Zachi Ali	Bassist	—	—	—

==== Elimination Table, Week 6 ====
The performance episode aired on October 30, 2010. The results episode aired on October 31, 2010.

Note
Buzzed out
Judges' choice
Advanced to the Top 28.
Finished in either fourth or fifth place; Won the judges' vote.
Finished in either fourth or fifth place; Lost the judges' vote.

Order	Performer	Act Description	Buzzes and Judges' Choices		
Order	Performer	Act Description	Vina	Anjas	Ria
1	Kingsley Tahapary	8-year old Dancer/Michael Jackson Impersonator	—	—	—
2	N' Quint	Pop Singer Group			
3	Laurentius Rando	Beatboxer	—	—	—
4	X'tra Ordinary (XO)	Duo Popping Dancer	—	—	—
5	(1st) Djitron Pah	Sasando Musician	—	—	—
6	RPM Brother	Boy Band		—	
7	Hari Agus	Comedian/Singer/Guitarist	—	—	
8	Beauty Fiction (BFC)	Cheerleading Group	—	—	—

==== Elimination Table, Week 7 ====
The performance episode aired on November 6, 2010. The results episode aired on November 7, 2010.

Note
Buzzed out
Judges' choice
Advanced to the Top 28.
Finished in either fourth or fifth place; Won the judges' vote.
Finished in either fourth or fifth place; Lost the judges' vote.

Order	Performer	Act Description	Buzzes and Judges' Choices		
Order	Performer	Act Description	Vina	Anjas	Ria
1	(1st) Vania Larissa	Opera Singer	—	—	—
2	Samsiwar	63-year-old Gymnast	—	—	—
3	PGRI	Traditional Dancer Group	—	—	—
4	Aloysius Budi	Classical Singer	—	—	—
5	Ion Mubarok	Singer/Bassist	—		—
6	Faisal	Stand Up Comedian	—	—	—
7	MR Budiman	Duo Ballroom Dancer		—	
8	Boediono	Singer/Guitarist	—	—	—

=== Top 28 (Finals) ===
The first episode of the Top 28 (Finals) performance was broadcast on November 13, 2010. Seven acts performed each week. A three-hour performance episode each Saturday was followed by an also three hour results show on Sunday, where three of the seven acts from the previous night remained in the competition. The judges' choice remained, as the judges got to decide whether the contestant who placed either in third or fourth place got to advance to the next round.

==== Elimination Table, Week 1 ====
The performance episode aired on November 13, 2010. The results episode aired on November 14, 2010.

Note
Buzzed out
Judges' choice
Advanced to the Top 28.
Finished in either third or fourth place; Won the judges' vote.
Finished in either third or fourth place; Lost the judges' vote.

Italics indicate the act was a wild card. Order indicates when the act performed during the performance episode.

Order	Performer	Act Description	Buzzes and Judges' Choices		
Order	Performer	Act Description	Vina	Anjas	Ria
1	Lucky Family Band	Band Group	—		
2	Bogie Papeda	Popping Dancer	—	—	—
3	(1st) Akademi Wushu Indonesia (AWI)	Martial Arts Group	—	—	—
4	Regia Rahadini	Traditional/Pop Singer	—	—	—
5	Munik	Duo Beat Armpit/Comedian	—	—	
6	(2nd) Daud	Singer/Guitarist	—	—	
7	Young Boys	Musician Group			

==== Elimination Table, Week 2 ====
The performance episode aired on November 20, 2010. The results episode aired on November 21, 2010.

Note
Buzzed out
Judges' choice
Advanced to the Top 28.
Finished in either third or fourth place; Won the judges' vote.
Finished in either third or fourth place; Lost the judges' vote.

Italics indicate the act was a wild card. Order indicates when the act performed during the performance episode.

Order	Performer	Act Description	Buzzes and Judges' Choices		
Order	Performer	Act Description	Vina	Anjas	Ria
1	Kingsley Tahapary	8-year-old Dancer/Michael Jackson Impersonator		—	—
2	Heni Chandra	Blind Singer/Guitarist	—		
3	Edwin Putra Mulyono	Pianist	—	—	—
4	PGRI	Traditional Dancer Group	—	—	—
5	Deden Hidayat	Rock Singer	—	—	—
6	(2nd) Djitron Pah	Sasando Musician	—	—	—
7	(1st) Vania Larissa	Opera Singer	—	—	—

==== Elimination Table, Week 3 ====
The performance episode aired on November 27, 2010. The results episode aired on November 28, 2010.

Note
Buzzed out
Judges' choice
Advanced to the Top 28.
Finished in either third or fourth place; Won the judges' vote.
Finished in either third or fourth place; Lost the judges' vote.

Italics indicate the act was a wild card. Order indicates when the act performed during the performance episode.

Order	Performer	Act Description	Buzzes and Judges' Choices		
Order	Performer	Act Description	Vina	Anjas	Ria
1	Raditya Adi Pramono	Ventriloquist	—		
2	(1st) Elnoe Budiman	3-year-old drummer	—	—	—
3	Waysy	Animal Action	—		—
4	Ida Ayu Rashtiti	Traditional Dancer/Ballerina	—	—	—
5	Hernawan Eko	Opera Singer			—
6	(2nd) To The Point	Dance Troupe	—	—	—
7	N'Quint	Pop Singer Group	—	—	—

==== Elimination Table, Week 4 ====
The performance episode aired on December 4, 2010. The results episode aired on December 5, 2010.

Note
Buzzed out
Judges' choice
Advanced to the Top 28.
Finished in either third or fourth place; Won the judges' vote.
Finished in either third or fourth place; Lost the judges' vote.

Italics indicate the act was a wild card. Order indicates when the act performed during the performance episode.

Order	Performer	Act Description	Buzzes and Judges' Choices		
Order	Performer	Act Description	Vina	Anjas	Ria
1	Melis Guraici	Pop Singer	—		—
2	MR Budiman	Duo Ballroom Dancer	—	—	
3	The Brothers	Opera Singer Group	—		—
4	(2nd) X'tra Ordinary (XO)	Duo Popping Dancer	—	—	—
5	(1st) Melita Meliala	Singer/Guitarist	—	—	—
6	Aloysius Budi	Classical Singer	—	—	—
7	Pragina Gong	Traditional & Modern Mixes Dancer Group		—	

=== Top 12 (Go To Grand Final) ===
The TOP 12 began on December 11, 2010. Six acts performed each week. A three-hour performance episode each Saturday was followed by an also three hour results show on Sunday, where three of the six acts from the previous night remained in the competition. The judges' choice remained, as the judges got to decide whether the contestant who placed either in third or fourth place got to advance to the next round.

==== Elimination Table, Week 1 ====
The performance episode aired on December 11, 2010. The results episode aired on December 12, 2010.

Note
Buzzed out
Judges' choice
Advanced to the Top 28.
Finished in either third or fourth place; Won the judges' vote.
Finished in either third or fourth place; Lost the judges' vote.

Italics indicate the act was a wild card. Order indicates when the act performed during the performance episode.

Order	Performer	Act Description	Buzzes and Judges' Choices		
Order	Performer	Act Description	Vina	Anjas	Ria
1	To The Point	Dance Troupe	—	—	—
2	(1st) Young Boys	Musician Group	—	—	—
3	Xtra Ordinary (XO)	Duo Popping Dancer	—		
4	(2nd) Melita Meliala	Singer/Guitarist	—	—	—
5	Hernawan Eko	Opera Singer	—	—	—
6	Pragina Gong	Traditional & Modern Mixes Dancer Group			

==== Elimination Table, Week 2 ====
The performance episode aired on December 18, 2010. The results episode aired on December 19, 2010.

Note
Buzzed out
Judges' choice
Advanced to the Top 28.
Finished in either third or fourth place; Won the judges' vote.
Finished in either third or fourth place; Lost the judges' vote.

Italics indicate the act was a wild card. Order indicates when the act performed during the performance episode.

Order	Performer	Act Description	Buzzes and Judges' Choices		
Order	Performer	Act Description	Vina	Anjas	Ria
1	Daud	Singer/Guitarist	—	—	—
2	Djitron Pah	Sasando Musician			—
3	(1st) Akademi Wushu Indonesia (AWI)	Martial Arts Group	—		
4	Elnoe Budiman	3-year-old Drummer	—	—	
5	(2nd) Vania Larissa	Opera Singer	—	—	—
6	Heni Chandra	Blind Singer/Guitarist	—	—	—

=== Grand Final ===
The Grand Final aired on Saturday, December 25, 2010, 2 hour.

The season finale aired on Sunday, December 26, 2010, 3 hours and featured performances from finalist who have been eliminated on previous rounds: IGT Dancers (X'tra Ordinary, Bogie Papeda, and To The Point), IGT Band (Edwin Putro Mulyono, Lucky Family Band, Zachi Ali, Ion Mubarok, Deden Hidayat, and Melis Guraici), Beauty Fiction, and IGT Tenors (The Brothers, Hernawan Eko, and Aloysius Budi).

Key
Winner
Runner-up

Performance Order	Finished	Artist	Act
1	6th	Pragina Gong	Traditional & Modern Mixes Dance Group
2	1st	Vania Larissa	Opera Singer
3	5th	Djitron Pah	Sasando Musician
4	4th	Melita Meliala	Singer/Guitarist
5	3rd	Akademi Wushu Indonesia (AWI)	Martial Arts Group
6	2nd	Young Boys	Musician Group
