= Putri Ariani =

Indonesian singer-songwriter (born 2005)

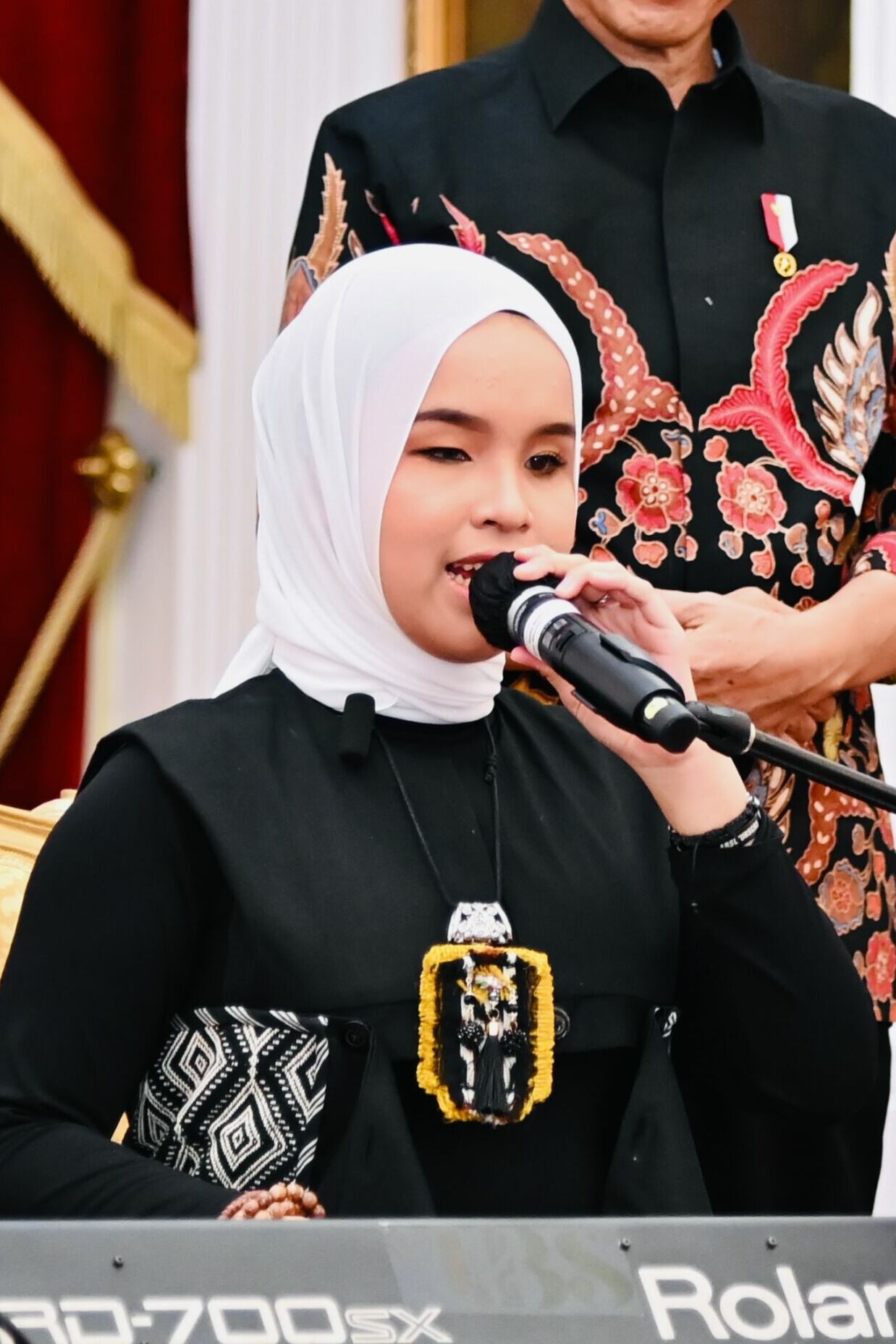
- Putri performs at Merdeka Palace in 2023
- Born: Ariani Nisma Putri; 31 December 2005 (age 20); Bangkinang, Kampar, Riau, Indonesia
- Education: Gadjah Mada University
- Occupation: Singer-songwriter
- Years active: 2014–present
- Known for: Indonesia's Got Talent season 2; America's Got Talent season 18
- Musical career
- Genre: Pop
- Instruments: Vocal; piano
- Website: putriariani.com

Ariani Nisma Putri (born 31 December 2005), known professionally as Putri Ariani, is an Indonesian pop singer-songwriter with visual impairment. She rose to fame after winning the competition Indonesia's Got Talent season 2. She gained global recognition for her participation in America's Got Talent 2023. Her audition video went viral and trended in over 30 countries. She placed 4th in the competition.

== Early life and education ==
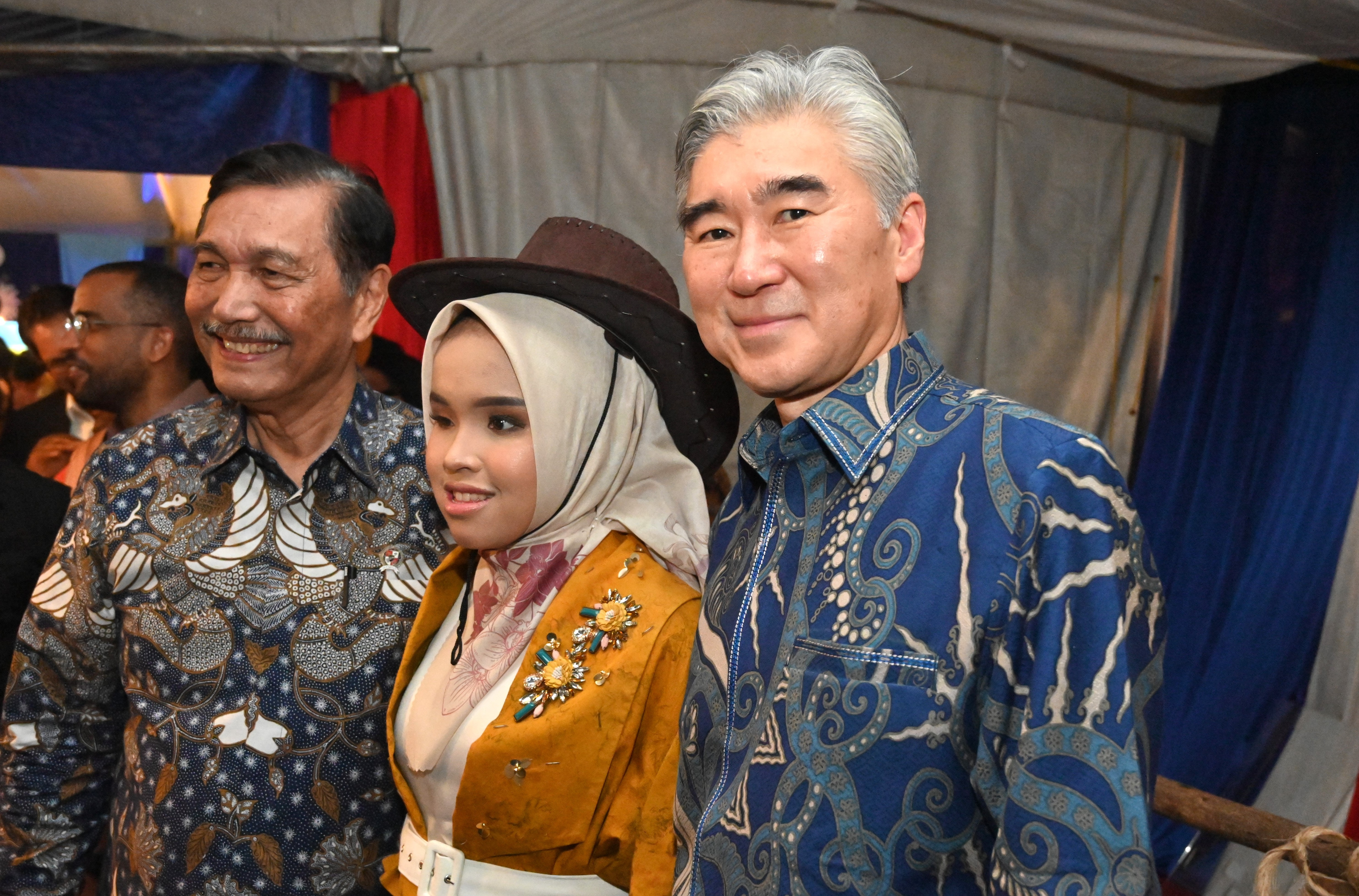
Putri (middle) with coordinating minister Luhut Binsar Pandjaitan and U.S. ambassador Sung Y. Kim.

Putri was born with the name Ariani Nisma Putri on 31 December 2005, in Bangkinang, Kampar, Riau. She is the first child of three siblings of Ismawan Kurnianto of Javanese descent from Bantul, Yogyakarta, and Reni Alfianty of Minangkabau from West Sumatra. Her maternal grandmother was named Asnilawati from Pandai Sikek, West Sumatra. Ariani is the first grandchild in her extended family. Putri has two younger sisters, Devina Elysia and Vania Larissa.

Putri was born prematurely at 6 months and 18 days of gestation due to her mother's placenta previa. After birth, Putri had to spend 3 months in an incubator at the hospital. Putri was then diagnosed with cataract when she was removed from the incubator. Her parents then took her to Singapore for treatment, where they diagnosed her with retinopathy of prematurity. She underwent surgery on her right eye, but it was unsuccessful. She was declared totally blind when she was 3 months old.

Putri was introduced to music by her grandmother, Asnilawati, and taught herself to sing without taking vocal lessons. She began performing on stage at the age of seven. Putri admitted that she often experienced bullying because she had a different physique.

In 2021, Putri attended vocational high school at SMK Negeri 2 Kasihan, also known as Yogyakarta Music High School (SMM) in Bantul Regency, Yogyakarta Special Region. She majored in flute. She was also asked to perform solo vocals at an SMM concert.

In 2024, Putri began her higher education at the Faculty of Law, Gadjah Mada University through the Penelusuran Bibit Unggul Berprestasi (PBUB) pathway in the Choir/Vocal Arts branch. Putri was also the representative of new students selected to take part in the alma mater jacket pinning ceremony at the 2024 PIONIR Gadjah Mada new student acceptance ceremony.
