= Miss Indonesia 2013 =

- Date: February 20, 2013
- Presenters: Daniel Mananta, Jennifer Sumia, Ovi Dian Aryani, Javier Justin
- Entertainment: NOAH, Bunga Citra Lestari, Cakra Khan, Febri Idol, Yoda Idol, Dion Idol
- Venue: Hall D2 Jakarta International Expo, Jakarta
- Broadcaster: RCTI
- Entrants: 33
- Placements: 10
- Winner: Vania Larissa; West Kalimantan

Miss Indonesia 2013 was the ninth edition of the Miss Indonesia beauty pageant, held on February 20, 2013 at Jakarta International Expo, Jakarta. The winner of Miss Indonesia 2013 will represent Indonesia in Miss World 2013 in Jakarta, Indonesia. The current titleholder of Miss World, Wenxia Yu attended the awarding night, when Ines Putri of Bali crowned her successor.

== Judges ==
- Liliana Tanaja Tanoesoedibjo
- Martha Tilaar
- Harry Darsono
- Ferry Salim
- Noor Sabah Nael Traavik

== Results ==
=== Placements ===
Final result	Contestant
Miss Indonesia 2013	West Kalimantan - Vania Larissa
1st Runner-up	Central Java - Jovita Dwijayanti
2nd Runner-up	West Java - Shinta Nur Safira Azzahra
Top 5	North Sumatra - Yemima Putri Alma Lamtiur Hutapea; Southeast Sulawesi - Claudia Marcia
Top 10	Bengkulu - Nadira Titalia; East Java - Regina Celine; Maluku - Marsha Emilia Pical; South Sulawesi - Fildzah Hidayatil Baqi Burhanuddin; Yogyakarta Special Region - Janice Jessica Hermijanto

=== Fast Track Winners ===
Fast track events held during preliminary round and the winners of Fast Track events are automatically qualified to enter the semifinal round. This year's fast track events include: Talent, Sport, Modelling, and Beauty With A Purpose.

- West Kalimantan - Vania Larissa (Talent)
- Bengkulu - Nadira Titalia (Beauty With A Purpose)
- Yogyakarta Special Region - Janice Jessica Hermijanto (Sport)
- East Java - Regina Celine (Modelling)

=== Special awards ===
Special Awards	Contestant
Miss Congeniality	Central Kalimantan - Balgis Novrilia
Miss Beauty Skin	Southeast Sulawesi - Claudia Marcia
Miss Online	Bengkulu - Nadira Titalia
Miss Lifestyle	Riau Islands - Jilly Lavenia Tan
Miss Very Fresh	Maluku - Marsha Emilia Pical
Miss Favourite	Central Java - Jovita Dwijayanti

=== Order of announcements ===
==== Top 10 ====
1. West Kalimantan
2. Bengkulu
3. Yogyakarta Special Region
4. East Java
5. West Java
6. Southeast Sulawesi
7. South Sulawesi
8. Central Java
9. North Sumatera
10. Maluku

==== Top 5 ====
1. West Kalimantan
2. North Sumatera
3. West Java
4. Southeast Sulawesi
5. Central Java

==== Top 3 ====
1. West Kalimantan
2. West Java
3. Central Java

== Non-Winners ==
Province	Delegate	Age	Height (cm)	Hometown	Reasons
Riau Islands	Jilly Lavenia Tan	19	1.67 m (5 ft 5 1/2 in)	Manado	Jilli is the most beautiful face this year. She really can be processed to meet the tastes of international beauty especially the judges of Miss World.
Jambi	Ayu Purnama Sari	22	1.66 m (5 ft 5 1/2 in)	Jambi	A national runner also the drum major marching band is one of the contestants who could potentially achieve a high score in Talent session thanks to the appearance of a magical talent and phenomenal.
Jakarta Special Capital Region	Karina Nandia Saputri	19	1.82 m (5 ft 11 1/2 in)	Jakarta	With towering posture Karina will easily steal the show among the hundreds of contestants of Miss World 2013.; He also has experience in the field of modeling, music, and sports that already have a strong enough foundation for a variety of competitions in the Miss World Fast Track.; Exotic facial Karina also be set up to highlight the impression of exotic Asian women also had the attraction or the strong appeal at the international level.
Bali	Gebby Yunita Wiguna	18	1.75 m (5 ft 9 in)	Singaraja	Has the charisma and stage presence; Steal the show because of her unique like a chameleon. On several occasions, he might have seemed very exotic charm of Balinese women. But on another occasion, he actually looks like a Eurasian with a Caucasian face-look. And the ability to perform like a chameleon is able to bring a model photoshoot Gebby successful.
North Maluku	Denalta Eunike Telew	20	1.66 m (5 ft 5 1/2 in)	Manado	One contestant with the most powerful face and character of this year, and is perfect for a catwalk model.

== Contestants ==
Province	Delegate	Age	Height (cm)	Hometown
Aceh	Retna Maharani	21	1.74 m (5 ft 8 1/2 in)	Banda Aceh
North Sumatra	Yemima Putri Alma Lamtiur Hutapea	18	1.71 m (5 ft 7 1/2 in)	Medan
West Sumatra	Chania Putri Cornelia	18	1.78 m (5 ft 10 in)	Padang
Riau	Popy Ramadan	23	1.70 m (5 ft 7 in)	Pekanbaru
Riau Islands	Jilly Lavenia Tan	19	1.67 m (5 ft 5 1/2 in)	Manado
Jambi	Ayu Purnama Sari	22	1.66 m (5 ft 5 1/2 in)	Jambi
South Sumatra	Ni Luh Frisilia Safirarani Datari	18	1.70 m (5 ft 7 in)	Palembang
Bangka-Belitung Islands	Debby Ari Kumala Dewi	21	1.70 m (5 ft 7 in)	Pangkalpinang
Bengkulu	Nadira Titalia	20	1.67 m (5 ft 5 1/2 in)	Bengkulu
Lampung	Muthiara Yonica Putri Diandra	21	1.74 m (5 ft 8 1/2 in)	Bandar Lampung
Jakarta Special Capital Region	Karina Nandia Saputri	19	1.69 m (5 ft 6 1/2 in)	Jakarta
Banten	Mey Diana Sari	20	1.73 m (5 ft 8 in)	Serang
West Java	Shinta Nur Safira Azzahra	19	1.74 m (5 ft 8 1/2 in)	Bandung
Central Java	Jovita Dwijayanti	18	1.76 m (5 ft 9 1/2 in)	Semarang
Yogyakarta Special Region	Janice Jessica Hermijanto	20	1.73 m (5 ft 8 in)	Yogyakarta
East Java	Regina Celine	18	1.84 m (6 ft 1/2 in)	Surabaya
Bali	Gebby Yunita Wiguna	18	1.75 m (5 ft 9 in)	Singaraja
West Nusa Tenggara	Ni Putu Wistyasari	20	1.69 m (5 ft 6 1/2 in)	Mataram
East Nusa Tenggara	Trie Wiyanti Andini	22	1.69 m (5 ft 6 1/2 in)	Kupang
West Kalimantan	Vania Larissa	17	1.71 m (5 ft 7 1/2 in)	Pontianak
South Kalimantan	Intan Kamil Hamzah	22	1.69 m (5 ft 6 1/2 in)	Banjarmasin
Central Kalimantan	Balgis Novrilia	20	1.75 m (5 ft 9 in)	Palangka Raya
East Kalimantan	Steffani Beatrix Lule	20	1.68 m (5 ft 6 in)	Bitung
Southeast Sulawesi	Claudia Marcia	17	1.76 m (5 ft 9 1/2 in)	Kendari
West Sulawesi	Ineke Bombing	20	1.68 m (5 ft 6 in)	Manado
South Sulawesi	Fildzah Hidayatil Baqi Burhanuddin	16	1.71 m (5 ft 7 1/2 in)	Makassar
Central Sulawesi	Dina Fitriana Badriansyah	16	1.72 m (5 ft 7 1/2 in)	Palu
North Sulawesi	Lydia Juliana Rumangkang	23	1.72 m (5 ft 7 1/2 in)	Manado
Gorontalo	Grace Blessing Mastiur Marbun	22	1.67 m (5 ft 5 1/2 in)	Manado
Maluku	Marsha Emilia Pical	19	1.70 m (5 ft 7 in)	Ambon
North Maluku	Denalta Eunike Telew	20	1.66 m (5 ft 5 1/2 in)	Manado
Papua	Priskilla Rastra Wasia	19	1.68 m (5 ft 6 in)	Jayapura
West Papua	Charlien Tania Saraswati	18	1.75 m (5 ft 9 in)	Manokwari

== Crossovers ==
Puteri Indonesia

- 2017 : Jakarta SCR - Karina Nandia Saputri (unplaced)

== Audition Schedule ==
- Medan: September 30, 2012
- Bandung: October 6–7, 2012
- Makassar: October 14, 2012
- Surabaya: October 21, 2012
- Denpasar: November 4, 2012
- Jakarta: November 15–16, 2012

=== Audition Miss Indonesia 2013 Special Hunt ===
- Manado: October 16, 2012
- Semarang and Yogyakarta: October 23–24, 2012

=== Audition Miss Indonesia 2013 Goes to Campus ===
- Universitas Trisakti
- London School of Public Relations
- Universitas Tarumanegara
- Universitas Atma Jaya: November 22, 2012
