= Indonesia's Got Talent season 2 =

Indonesia's Got Talent
- Season 2
- Presented by: Ibnu Jamil; Evan Sanders
- Judges: Indy Barends; Anggun C. Sasmi; Ari Lasso; Jay Subiyakto
- Winner: Putri Ariani
- Runner-up: Shine!
- Location: Teater Tanah Airku, TMII, Jakarta (Audition); Balai Sarbini, Jakarta (Semifinals & Finals)

Release
- Original network: SCTV
- Original release: 5 April – 19 July 2014

Season chronology
- ← Previous; Season 1 Next → Season 3

The second season of the talent show competition series Indonesia's Got Talent premiered on SCTV on 5 April 2014, and concluded on 19 July 2014. This program is a franchise of the Got Talent series owned by Simon Cowell and the company SYCO. If the first season aired on Indosiar in 2010, and the second season was broadcast on SCTV in 2014.

== Host & Judges ==
Unlike previous seasons, all host and judges in this season are new.

=== Host ===
- Evan Sanders
- Ibnu Jamil

=== Judges ===
- Indy Barends
- Ari Lasso
- Anggun
- Jay Subiyakto

== Sponsor ==
- Mito
- Indomie
- Wardah
- Roma Biscuit

== Season Overview ==
=== Semi finals ===
Buzzed out
Judges' vote

Won the public vote
Won the judges' vote (or public vote if split decision)
Lost the judges' vote (or public vote if split decision)

==== Semi-final 1 (23 May) ====
The 1st Semi-Final aired on 23 May 2014.

Contestant	Order	Act	Buzzes and judges' votes				Finished	Result
Contestant	Order	Act	Indy	Ari	Anggun	Jay	Finished	Result
Putri Ariani	1	Singer						(Top 3) Won Public Vote
Stick On Us	2	Drummers						(Top 3) Lost Judges Vote
Bian Lian	3	Face Changers						Eliminated
Ari Wibowo	4	Singer						(Top 3) Won Judges Vote
Dodi Suryadi	5	Animal Act						Eliminated
Azura Sakti	6	Marching Troupe						Eliminated
Jaipong & Waywang	7	Danger Act						Eliminated
Nora Band	8	Boy Band						Eliminated
Dark Angles	9	Girl Group						Eliminated

==== Semi-final 2 (30 May) ====
The 2nd Semi-Final aired on 30 May 2014

Contestant	Order	Act	Buzzes and judges' votes				Finished	Result
Contestant	Order	Act	Indy	Ari	Anggun	Jay	Finished	Result
Shaquilla	1	Singer						(Top 3) Won Public Vote
Gimbal	2	Dancers						(Top 3) Won Judges Vote
Rifky Ardiansyah	3	Singer & Violinist						Eliminated
Ade & Gabriel	4	Dancing Duo						Eliminated
Big Sist	5	Singing Duo						(Top 3) Lost Judges Vote
Flame	6	Fire & Traditional Dance Troupe						Eliminated
PHP Percussion	7	Percussionists						Eliminated
The Basket Ball Gank	8	Basketball Dancers						Eliminated
4U	9	Singers						Eliminated

==== Semi-final 3 (7 June) ====
The 3rd Semi-Final aired on 7 June 2014.

Contestant	Order	Act	Buzzes and judges' votes				Finished	Result
Contestant	Order	Act	Indy	Ari	Anggun	Jay	Finished	Result
Go Block-S	1	Boy Band						Eliminated
Winston Kurnia	2	Pianist						(Top 3) Won Judges Vote
Claudya Fritsca	3	Singer						(Top 3) Won Public Vote
Dwi Arta	4	Dancers						Eliminated
Wushi	5	Barongsai						(Top 3) Lost Judges Vote
Richard Affandi	6	Singer						Eliminated
Superman & Robin	7	Bike Act						Eliminated
Two Charlie Chaplin	8	Comedic Dancers						Eliminated

==== Semi-final 4 (14 June) ====
The 4th Semi-Final aired on 14 June 2014

Contestant	Order	Act	Buzzes and judges' votes				Finished	Result
Contestant	Order	Act	Maia	Ari	Anggun	Jay	Finished	Result
Want To Be Dancer	1	Dancers						Eliminated
DNA	2	Artist						Eliminated
Lovly Dog	3	Animal Act						(Top 3) Won Public Vote
Helen Renata Gunawan	4	Whistler						(Top 3) Lost Judges Vote
M. Al Tora	5	Magician						Eliminated
AWI Junior	6	Dance Troupe						(Top 3) Won Judges Vote
I Am Dance Company	7	Dance Troupe						Eliminated
Alto Soraya	8	Singing Duo						Eliminated
Timun	9	Theatrical Act						Eliminated

==== Semi-final 5 (21 June) ====
The 5th Semi-Final aired on 21 June 2014.

Contestant	Order	Act	Buzzes and judges' votes				Finished	Result
Contestant	Order	Act	Dewi	Ari	Anggun	Jay	Finished	Result
X-Cool Dancer	1	Dancers						(Top 3) Won Public Vote
Ahmad Fauzi	2	Singer						(Top 3) Lost Judges Vote
Rafi Galsa	3	Family Band						(Top 3) Won Judges Vote
Rachzonja	4	Drummer						Eliminated
Nicky Saraw	5	Singer						Eliminated
Iwan Fals	6	One Man Band						Eliminated
Ni Luh Leny	7	Dancer						Eliminated
3B Stars	8	Singing Group Group						Eliminated

==== Semi-final 6 (28 June) ====
The 6th Semi-Final aired on 28 June 2014.

Contestant	Order	Act	Buzzes and judges' votes				Finished	Result
Contestant	Order	Act	Indy	Ari	Anggun	Jay	Finished	Result
The Blessings	1	Singing Group						Eliminated
DBM	2	Dance Troupe						Eliminated
Rendy Namsa	3	Singer						(Top 3) Won Judges Vote
Andri Bintang	4	Ring Artist						Eliminated
Shine	5	Singer						(Top 3) Won Public Vote
Gilbran Andhika	6	Dancer						Eliminated
Dwi Maya	7	Singer						Eliminated
Ira Christy Pitaloka	8	Pionist						(Top 3) Lost Judges Vote

=== Grand Final ===
Number	contestant	performance	result
1	Putri Ariani	Singer	Winner
2	Shine	Singing	Runner-Up
3	Awi Junior	Dancing	TOP 5
4	Lovly Dog	Animal Act	TOP 5
5	Shaquilla	Singing	TOP 5
6	Ari Wibowo	Singer	TOP 12
7	Winston Kurnia	Pianoist	TOP 12
8	Rafi Galsa	Singer	TOP 12
9	X-Cool Dancer	Dancer	TOP 12
10	Rendy Namsa	Singing	TOP 12
11	Claudya Fritsca	Singer	TOP 12
12	Gimbal	Dancing	TOP 12
