= The Sacred Riana =

Indonesian magician and illusionist (born 1992)

- Born: Marie Antoinette Riana Graharani; 13 July 1992 (age 34); Jakarta, Indonesia
- Other name: Riana Antoinette
- Education: St. Ursula Catholic School; University of Bunda Mulia
- Occupations: Magician; illusionist
- Years active: 2012–present
- Parent: Chrisiandy Yuniarto (father)

Marie Antoinette Riana Graharani (born 13 July 1992), commonly known as The Sacred Riana, is an Indonesian magician and illusionist best known for her performance as a bizarre illusionist.

== Career ==
Riana has appeared on several television shows and joined several talent search shows as a guest or contestant.

She made her television debut as a contestant on Deddy Corbuzier's magic competition show The Next Mentalist, which premiered on 17 November 2013 and was broadcast on Trans 7. She would go on to become the show's runner-up, successfully attracting the attention of the Indonesian public with her unique appearance.

In 2017, Riana joined the second season of Asia's Got Talent where she was declared the winner after beating the Filipino hip-hop dance group DM-X Comvaleñoz based on the audience votes in the grand final. There have been over 70 million views on Facebook and YouTube of Riana's magic performances onstage.

In 2018, Riana appeared on season 13 of America's Got Talent where she finished as a quarterfinalist. She was also the second Indonesian to enter an AGT's live show after Demian Aditya. On 21 August 2018, during the AGT Quarter-finals 2, Riana's act was abruptly cut to black and a commercial break before the end of her performance, which confused many viewers about what had just happened and quickly provoked a huge question on social media, but according to a set of production notes which have been posted on Twitter, the dramatic "cut-to-black" moment was actually part of the plan all along. She was also announced to be one of the participants of America's Got Talent: All-Stars and was eliminated in the first round of Preliminary 4 on 23 January 2023.

On 31 August 2019, Riana participated in Britain's Got Talent: The Champions and was eliminated in the first round of Preliminaries 1.

In 2022, Riana appeared in La France a un incroyable talent and finished as a semifinalist. In September 2023, she appeared in Italia's Got Talent on Disney+ but did not pass the selection at the end of the episode.

In 2019, under the stage name Riana Antoinette, Riana made her acting career debut by playing as Riana in The Sacred Riana: Beginning, which was released on 14 March 2019. She reprised her role as Riana in The Sacred Riana 2: Bloody Mary, which was released on 28 July 2022.

From 2019 to 2020, Riana became a judge in The Great Magician.

== Artistry ==
Riana and her manager chose the epithet "The Sacred" because they think that doing magic is a sacred thing for some people.

Riana has a distinctive appearance, characterized by head and hand twitching movements, always stands with one of her legs bent and a flat facial expression. Riana always appears with long and loose hair that covers most of her face. In each stage appearance, Riana wears a long-sleeved dress and white tights and also holds her doll, Riani, which wears the same style of clothing as the magician. When she speaks during performances, she does so in a quavering and unclear voice.

== Filmography ==
=== Film ===
Year	Title	Role	Notes
2019	The Sacred Riana: Beginning	Riana	Credited as Riana Antoinette
2022	The Sacred Riana 2: Bloody Mary	Riana	—

=== Television ===
==== As a guest ====
Year	Show	Role	Note	Ref
2014	Hitam Putih	Guest	On 10 February	
2019	Ini Talkshow	Guest	On 13 March	
2022	FOCI Halloween Party	Guest	On 29 October	
2024	Grand Opening BNS Hype MOI	Guest	On 30 November	
2026	Bisikan Gaib	Guest		
2026	XClusive	Guest		

==== As a performer ====
Year	Show	Role	Note	Ref
2014	Goyang Goyang Senggol	Performer	On 23 August – 14 September	
2014	The Magic Show	Performer	On 19 December	
2015	The Magic Show	Performer	On 2 January – 23 January	
2015	Kontes Final KDI	Performer	On 21 May	
2018	Liga Dangdut Indonesia	Performer	On 23 January	
2018	Dahsyatnya Awards 2018	Performer	On 25 January	
2018	The Grand Master Asia	Performer	On 4 March	
2018	antv 25 Tahun: Indonesia Keren 3	Performer	On 1 April	
2018	Grand Final The Grand Master Asia	Performer	On 30 April	
2018	Hallow From The Other Side	Performer	On 26 – 29 October	
2018	SCTV Awards 2018	Performer	On 30 November	
2019	Penghuni Rumah Terakhir	Performer	On 9 January	
2019	IBOMA 2019	Performer	On 5 April	
2019	Magicomic Show	Performer	On 13 July – 17 August	
2019	Amazing 17	Performer	On 9 October	
2020	Masters of Illusion	Performer	On 22 May	
2023	Spekta 3 Dekade HUT ANTV 2023	Performer	On 16 March	
2023	The Sacred Riana Conjuring Live in Kuala Lumpur	Performer	On 15 July	
2023	Malam Puncak HUT SCTV 33Xtraordinary	Performer	On 25 August	
2023	Magical Halloween	Performer	On 22 October	
2023	The Sacred Riana Conjuring Live in Singapore	Performer	On 2 December	
2024	Alone: The Sacred Riana	Performer	On 2–18 February	
2024	Road to Kilau Raya Magical Concert	Performer	On 16 May	
2024	Konser Raya 28 Tahun Indosiar LUA28IASA	Performer	On 26 August	
2024	Dark Halloween	Performer	On 31 August	
2026	Alone: The Sacred Riana	Performer		

==== As both ====
Year	Show	Role	Note	Ref
2012	Hizteria	Guest and performer		
2014	Indonesia Lawak Klub	Guest and performer	On 6 February	
2014	Campur-Campur	Guest and performer	On 2 March	
2014	Opera Van Java	Guest and performer	On 13 March	
2017	Rumah Mama Amy	Guest and performer	On 11 November	
2017	Dahsyat	Guest and performer	On 14 November	
2017	Hitam Putih	Guest and performer	On 24 November	
2017	Pesbukers	Guest and performer	On 23 December	
2017	Tonight's Primetime	Guest and performer	On 26 December	
2017	Pesbukers	Guest and performer	On 27 – 29 December	
2018	Ini Talkshow	Guest and performer	On 11 September	
2020	Tonight's Show	Guest and performer	On 8 September	

==== Competitive and Got Talent appearances ====
Year	Show	Season	Results	Notes
2012	Stand Up Magic Indonesia	—	Winner	
2013–2014	The Next Mentalist	1	Runner-up	
2017	Asia's Got Talent	2	Winner	
2018	America's Got Talent	13	Quarterfinalist	
2019	Britain's Got Talent: The Champions	1	—	
2019–2020	The Great Magician	—	—	As a judge
2022	La France a un incroyable talent	12	Semifinalist	
2022	Indonesia's Got Talent	3	—	As a guest star
2023	America's Got Talent: All-Stars	1	—	
2023	Italia's Got Talent	13	—	

== Awards and nominations ==
Year	Award	Category	Nominated work	Result	Ref
2018	Talent Recap Fan Choice Awards	Breakout Talent Show Star	America's Got Talent	Nominated	
