= Thailand's Got Talent season 5 =

Thailand's Got Talent
- Season 5
- Hosted by: Ketsepsawat Palagawong na Ayutthaya
- Judges: Nitipong Hornak; Pornchita na Songkhla; Patcharasri Benjamad; Chalatit Tantiwut
- Winner: Thaiphukiaw
- Runner-up: Angsumalin Kongthai

Release
- Original network: THAITV CH3
- Original release: 7 June – 30 August 2015

Season chronology
- ← Previous; Season 4 Next → Season 6

Thailand's Got Talent season 5 (also known as TGT) was the fifth season of the Thailand's Got Talent reality television series on the Channel 3 television network, and part of the global British Got Talent series. It is a talent show that features singers, dancers, sketch artists, comedians and other performers of all ages competing for the advertised top prize of 10,000,000 Baht (approximately $325,000). The show debuted in June 2015. Thailand is also the fifth country in Asia to license Got Talent series. The four judges Chalatit Tantiwut, Patcharasri Benjamad, Pornchita Na Songkla and Nitipong Hornak join hosts Ketsepsawat Palagawongse na Ayutthaya.

== Broadcast ==
- Audition 6 weeks.
- DO-MORE Week 1 week.
- Semi-final 5 weeks.
- Final 1 week.

== Semi-finals ==
=== Semi-finalists ===
Winner
Runner-up
Finalist
Semi-finalist (lost judges' or public vote)

Golden buzzer

TGT	Name of act	Age(s)	Genre	Act	Semi-final	Result
01	Petcharat Saeng	5 - 50	Music	Traditional Musician Group	1	Eliminated
02	Anurak Sichompu	17	Gymnastics	Contortionist Dancer	1	Eliminated (lost judges' vote)
03	MUWAN	20	Singing	Singing Duo	1	Eliminated
04	Angsumalin Kongthai	6	Variety	Actress	1	Runner-up
05	Highlight	10 - 30	Acrobatics	Acrobatic Troupe	1	Finalist (won judges vote)
06	Magilicious	23 - 30	Magic	Comic Magician Group	1	Eliminated
07	Saw Sabad	20 - 25	Singing	Country Band	2	Finalist (won public vote)
08	N & J	14 & 16	Singing	Singers & Keyboardist	2	Eliminated
09	Miss Foxy	20 - 25	Dance	Dance Troupe	2	Eliminated (lost judges' vote)
10	Nichapha Luanwutthi	16	Singing	Singer	2	Eliminated
11	Heart & Soul	30 - 40	Dance	Contemporary Dance Duo	2	Eliminated
12	Na Atsachan	18 - 26	Variety	Stand Cheer Group	2	Finalist (won judges' vote)
13	Mutatera	20 - 23	Singing	Rock band	3	Eliminated (lost judges' vote)
14	Utsani Rakthai	19	Singing	Rapper/Guitarist	3	Eliminated
15	S.U. combo	20 - 21	Singing	A Cappella Singing Group	3	Eliminated
16	Thaiphukiao	13 - 14	Dance	Comic Dance Group	3	Winner
17	Sabad Lai	20 - 60	Singing	Traditional Band	3	Finalist
18	Face Cracking	21 & 26	Dance	Videomapping Dance Group	3	Eliminated
19	Car Percussion	22 - 30	Music	Percussion Group	4	Eliminated
20	Rakkaeo	21 - 27	Gymnastics	Gymnastics Group	4	Eliminated
21	Female F'actors	15 - 19	Dance	Dance Troupe	4	Eliminated (lost judges' vote)
22	Di - Notte	20 - 26	Singing	Operatic Group	4	Eliminated
23	KRIYOGA	23 - 37	Gymnastics	Yoga Group	4	Finalist (won public vote)
24	Khanadontri Handmade	20 - 23	Singing	Pop Band	4	Finalist (won judges' vote)
25	Body Balance Plus	24 - 32	Gymnastics	Gymnastics Group	5	Eliminated (lost judges' vote)
26	Terk Laser	35	Dance	Laser Dancer	5	Eliminated
27	TSD	20 - 30	Acrobatics	Basketball Player Group	5	Eliminated
28	For. Fun	18 - 23	Music	Classical Musician Group	5	Eliminated
29	Bangkok Dance Academy	13 - 23	Gymnastics	Ballet Group	5	Finalist (won judges vote)
30	Pansaya Khiaopluang	17	Singing	Musical Theatre Singer/Quick-change Artist	5	Finalist (won public vote)

=== Semi-final 1 (26 July) ===
TGT	Contestant	Act	Buzzes and judges' votes				Result
TGT	Contestant	Act	Nitipong	Pornchita	Patcharasri	Chalatit	Result
TGT01	Pedcharad Saeng	Thai musical instrument					Eliminated
TGT02	Anurak Seechomphoo	Contortionist dance					Top 3 (lost judges' vote)
TGT03	Muwan	Duo singer					Eliminated
TGT04	Angsumalin Kongthai	Acting show					Top 3 (won public vote)
TGT05	Highlight	Acrobatic troupe					Top 3 (won judges' vote)
TGT06	Magilicious	Magical entertainer					Eliminated

=== Semi-final 2 (2 August) ===
TGT	Contestant	Act	Buzzes and judges' votes				Result
TGT	Contestant	Act	Nitipong	Pornchita	Patcharasri	Chalatit	Result
TGT07	Saw Sabad	Music band					Top 3 (won public vote)
TGT08	N & J	Singer					Eliminated
TGT09	Miss Foxy	Dance troupe					Top 3 (lost judges' vote)
TGT10	Nichapha Luanwut	Singer					Eliminated
TGT11	Heart & Soul	Ballet					Eliminated
TGT12	Na Adsachan	Stand Cheer					Top 3 (won judges' vote)

=== Semi-final 3 (9 August) ===
TGT	Contestant	Act	Buzzes and judges' votes				Result
TGT	Contestant	Act	Nitipong	Pornchita	Patcharasri	Chalatit	Result
TGT13	Mutatera	Music band					Top 3 (lost judges' vote)
TGT14	Udsanee Rakthai	Singer/guitarist					Eliminated
TGT15	S.U. Combo	Acapella					Eliminated
TGT16	Thaiphukiaw	Dance troupe					Top 3 (won public vote)
TGT17	Sabad Lai	Theater Show					Top 3 (won judges' vote)
TGT18	Face Cracking	Videomapping dance group					Eliminated

=== Semi-final 4 (16 August) ===
TGT	Contestant	Act	Buzzes and judges' votes				Result
TGT	Contestant	Act	Nitipong	Pornchita	Patcharasri	Chalatit	Result
TGT19	Car Percussion	Percussion					Eliminated
TGT20	Rakkaew	Dance troupe					Eliminated
TGT21	Female F'actors	Dance troupe					Top 3 (lost judges' vote)
TGT22	Di - Notte	Opera Singer					Eliminated
TGT23	KRIYOGA	Yoga					Top 3 (won public vote)
TGT24	Khanadontree Handmade	Music band					Top 3 (won judges' vote)

=== Semi-final 5 (23 August) ===
TGT	Contestant	Act	Buzzes and judges' votes				Result
TGT	Contestant	Act	Nitipong	Pornchita	Patcharasri	Chalatit	Result
TGT25	Body Balance Plus	Body Balance					Top 3 (lost judges' vote)
TGT26	Terk Laser	Dance/Laser Show					Eliminated
TGT27	TSD	Basketball					Eliminated
TGT28	For. Fun	Classical music					Eliminated
TGT29	Bangkok Dance Academy	Ballet					Top 3 (won judges' vote)
TGT30	Pansaya Khiawpluang	Musical singer					Top 3 (won public vote)

== Finals ==
TGT	Contestant	Act	Result				
TGT	Contestant	Act	Result	TGT01	Khanadontree Handmade	Music band	Top 10
TGT02	Pansaya Khiawpluang	Musical singer	Top 10				
TGT03	Na Adsachan	Stand Cheer	Top 10				
TGT04	Angsumalin Kongthai	Acting show	Runner-up				
TGT05	Saw Sabad	Music band	Top 5				
TGT06	Sabad Lai	Theater Show	Top 5				
TGT07	KRIYOGA	Yoga	Top 10				
TGT08	Bangkok Dance Academy	Ballet	Top 5				
TGT09	Highlight	Acrobatic troupe	Top 10				
TGT10	Thaiphukiaw	Dance troupe	Winner				
