= Thailand's Got Talent season 7 =

Thailand's Got Talent
- Season 7
- Hosted by: Kathsepsawad Palakawong na Ayuthaya
- Judges: Pongsak Rattanaphong; Cris Horwang; Jennifer Kim; Yuhtlerd Sippapak

Release
- Original network: Workpoint TV
- Original release: August 6, 2018 – present

Season chronology
- ← Previous; Season 6

Thailand's Got Talent season 7 (also known as TGT) was the seventh season of the Thailand's Got Talent reality television series on the Workpoint TV television network, and part of the global British Got Talent series. It is a talent show that features singers, dancers, sketch artists, comedians and other performers of all ages competing for the advertised top prize of 1,000,000 Baht. The show debuted on 6 August 2018. Thailand is also the fifth country in Asia to license Got Talent series. The four judges Yuhtlerd Sippapak, Jennifer Kim, Cris Horwang and Pongsak Rattanaphong join hosts Ketsepsawat Palagawongse na Ayutthaya.

== Auditions ==
Yes
No
Golden buzzer
Buzzed

=== Week 1 (August 6, 2018) ===
#	Contestant	Age(s)	Hometown	Act	Buzzes and judges' choices				Result
#	Contestant	Age(s)	Hometown	Act	Yuhtlerd	Jennifer	Cris	Pongsak	Result
1	Alisha	5	Bangkok	Pole Dancer/Gymnast					Advanced to Semifinals
2	Sunny Brass	19-25	Bangkok	Beatboxers/Rappers Group					Eliminated in Culling
3	Saichon Mahawek	38	Pathum Thani	Comedy Magician					Eliminated in Culling
4	Ploychompoo Payonrat	29	Bangkok	Aerialist					Advanced to Semifinals

=== Week 2 (August 13, 2018) ===
#	Contestant	Age(s)	Hometown	Act	Buzzes and judges' choices				Result
#	Contestant	Age(s)	Hometown	Act	Yuhtlerd	Jennifer	Cris	Pongsak	Result
1	Pimpisa	5	Bangkok	Aerialist					Advanced to Semifinals
2	Harmony	21-35	Nakhon Ratchasima	Treadmill Dance Group					Eliminated
3	YB Spin	17-18	Bangkok	Baton Twirling Group					Eliminated
4	Bandai	12-15	Ratchaburi	Acrobatic Group					Advanced to Semifinals
5	Siwakorn	17	Khon Kaen	Musical Theatre Singer					Eliminated
6	Chakkrapong	35	Uthai Thani	Comedy Singer-Songwriter					Eliminated
7	Merian Axelgaard	26	Chiang Mai	Singer					Eliminated in Culling
8	Dramalism	21-23	Bangkok	Mime					Eliminated in Culling

=== Week 3 (August 20, 2018) ===
#	Contestant	Age(s)	Hometown	Act	Buzzes and judges' choices				Result
#	Contestant	Age(s)	Hometown	Act	Yuhtlerd	Jennifer	Cris	Pongsak	Result
1	Monkey Boys	9-11	Pathum Thani	Boyband					Eliminated in Culling
2	Piyapong	33	Bangkok	Mentalist					Advanced to Semifinals
3	Thamakorn	7	Bangkok	Dancer					Eliminated in Culling
4	Chaiyo	9-12	Bueng Kan	Dance Group					Advanced to Semifinals
5	Sabadlai	26-50	Ratchaburi	Musical Theatre Act					Advanced to Semifinals

=== Week 4 (August 27, 2018) ===
#	Contestant	Age(s)	Hometown	Act	Buzzes and judges' choices				Result
#	Contestant	Age(s)	Hometown	Act	Yuhtlerd	Jennifer	Cris	Pongsak	Result
1	Dance is me by Bangkok Dance Academy	9-16	Bangkok	Dance Group					Eliminated in Culling
2	Mittraphap Kaneng	26 & 31	Laos	Aerialists Duo					Advanced to Semifinals
3	Over Crew	12-15	Bangkok/ Samut Prakan	Hip-Hop Dance Group					Eliminated
4	Shin Koizumi	38	Japan	Impressionist					Eliminated
5	Banlang	25	Chiang Rai	Speed Painter					Eliminated in Culling
6	Wai Seeds	14-18	Khon Kaen	Acoustic Band					Eliminated
7	Phatthanan	18	Bangkok	Singer					Eliminated
8	Satita	14	Bangkok	Singer					Advanced to Semifinals
9	Body Balance Men	21-35	Bangkok	Acrobatic Group					Eliminated in Culling

=== Week 5 (September 3, 2018) ===
#	Contestant	Age(s)	Hometown	Act	Buzzes and judges' choices				Result
#	Contestant	Age(s)	Hometown	Act	Yuhtlerd	Jennifer	Cris	Pongsak	Result
1	Psycho	18 & 31	Bangkok	Comedy Juggler/Danger Act					Advanced to Semifinals
2	Worrachet	23	Nonthaburi	Dancer					Eliminated
3	Ledleela	19-22	Bangkok	Dance Group					Eliminated
4	Aerial Amazons	38 & 40	Chonburi	Aerialists Duo					Advanced to Semifinals
5	PSC06	20-36	Phuket	Hip-Hop Dance Group					Eliminated in Culling
6	4DM	13-21	Bangkok	Multimedia Performance Act					Eliminated in Culling
7	1.C+1	26-29	Bangkok	Technological Dance Trio					Eliminated in Culling

=== Week 6 (September 10, 2018) ===
#	Contestant	Age(s)	Hometown	Act	Buzzes and judges' choices				Result
#	Contestant	Age(s)	Hometown	Act	Yuhtlerd	Jennifer	Cris	Pongsak	Result
1	Yao Wang	26	China	Popping Dancer					Eliminated in Culling
2	FingerSlide	23-46	Khon Kaen	Rock Band					Eliminated in Culling
3	Mix Percussion	22-31	Bangkok	Body Percussionists Group					Eliminated in Culling
4	To be Girlz	18-21	Chiang Mai/Uttaradit/ Samut Songkhram	Girl Group/Dance Group					Eliminated
5	Mix a Move	26-28	Bangkok	Dance Group					Eliminated in Culling
6	Jessica Okorie	16	Bangkok	Singer/Rapper/Dancer					Eliminated in Culling
7	Flyer Ella	20-26	Chonburi	Aerialists Group					Eliminated in Culling
8	Street Workout Thai Team	17-40	Bangkok	Street Workout Group					Eliminated in Culling
9	KV Family	26-50	Bangkok	Aerialists Group					Advanced to Semifinals

=== Week 7 (September 17, 2018) ===
#	Contestant	Age(s)	Hometown	Act	Buzzes and judges' choices				Result
#	Contestant	Age(s)	Hometown	Act	Yuhtlerd	Jennifer	Cris	Pongsak	Result
1	Mix Cinema	8-35	Chiang Mai/Bangkok	Comedy Act					Advanced to Semifinals
2	Seventy Seven	17-23	Khon Kaen	Hip-Hop/Street Dance Group					Eliminated in Culling
3	Tip Toes by Bangkok Dance Academy	13-20	Bangkok	Ballet Dance Group					Advanced to Semifinals
4	BKK BOY BAND	17-26	Bangkok	Percussionists Group					Eliminated in Culling
5	Queen of Art	28-34	Bangkok/Nong Khai/ Maha Sarakham	Aerialists Trio					Eliminated in Culling
6	ONE NIGHT STAND	20-39	Bangkok	Rock Band					Eliminated in Culling
7	Band on the run	57-74	Bangkok	Country Band					Eliminated in Culling
8	Tabitha King	52	United States	Singer					Advanced to Semifinals

=== Week 8 (September 24, 2018) ===
#	Contestant	Age(s)	Hometown	Act	Buzzes and judges' choices				Result
#	Contestant	Age(s)	Hometown	Act	Yuhtlerd	Jennifer	Cris	Pongsak	Result
1	Super Pol. No.1	25-28	Bangkok	Hip-Hop Dance Group					Eliminated in Culling
2	Kiatniyom	6-35	Bangkok	Popping Dance Group					Advanced to Semifinals
3	Pramote	43	Samut Prakan	Yodeler					Eliminated
4	Thanwa Phanthong	20	Uttaradit	Singer-songwriter/Guitarist					Eliminated
5	Somsak	25	Narathiwat	Lip Sync Act					Eliminated
6	Chalab	13 & 15	Bangkok	Musical Theatre; Singing Duo					Eliminated in Culling
7	Nattapoom	19-39	Bangkok	Khon					Eliminated in Culling
8	Phaka Lamduan	19-22	Sisaket	Southern Isan Cultural Performers					Eliminated in Culling
9	Suphot	30	Chonburi	Aerialist					Eliminated in Culling
10	Khrobkhrua Sinlapa	6-37	Bangkok	Abstract Painting Trio					Eliminated in Culling

=== Week 9 (October 1, 2018) ===
#	Contestant	Age(s)	Hometown	Act	Buzzes and judges' choices				Result
#	Contestant	Age(s)	Hometown	Act	Yuhtlerd	Jennifer	Cris	Pongsak	Result
1	Mae Ui Show	20-35	Bangkok	Acrobatic Group					Eliminated in Culling
2	Kaiyakam Hmoob Lawj Xeeb	4-27	Chiang Rai	Acrobatic Group					Advanced to Semifinals
3	Miracle Twins	5	Bangkok	Drummers Duo					Eliminated in Culling
4	August & Taan	6 & 9	Chiang Mai	Drummers Duo					Eliminated in Culling
5	Phakin	7	Bangkok	Drummer					Advanced to Semifinals
6	Thanaboode	13	Sisaket	Voice Actor					Eliminated in Culling
7	Titrapron	22	Pathum Thani	Pole Dancer					Eliminated in Culling
8	Baby New Gen	8-12	Surat Thani	Dance Group					Eliminated in Culling
9	Siwabut	18-23	Bangkok	Thai Cultural Performers					Eliminated in Culling
10	Sinsaidoendong	19-20	Khon Kaen	Band					Eliminated in Culling
11	Pimpaya	21	Bangkok	Singer					Advanced to Semifinals
12	Phongsak	44	Chonburi	Singer/Keyboardist					Eliminated in Culling

=== Week 10 (October 8, 2018) ===
#	Contestant	Age(s)	Hometown	Act	Buzzes and judges' choices				Result
#	Contestant	Age(s)	Hometown	Act	Yuhtlerd	Jennifer	Cris	Pongsak	Result
1	Hang Over	20-24	Phuket	Rock Band					Eliminated in Culling
2	Ampper Girl Group	18-26	Songkhla/Bangkok	Percussionists Group					Eliminated in Culling
3	SRV BAND	13-18	Bangkok	Band					Eliminated in Culling
4	Ruenruedee	51	Bangkok	Pole Dancer					Eliminated
5	Yaowasin	7-22	Bangkok	Gymnastic Group					Eliminated in Culling
6	P2K	10-11	Bangkok	Hip-Hop Dance/Rap Trio					Eliminated in Culling
7	Break Beat	18-26	Udon Thani	Hip-Hop Dance Group					Eliminated in Culling
8	Phanumat	28	Bangkok	Hip-Hop Dancer/Puppeteer					Eliminated in Culling
9	Ping Lumprapleng	53	Bangkok	Mime Dancer					Advanced to Semifinals

== Semifinals ==
=== Semifinalists ===
Winner | Runner-up
Finalist (Final Result Pending) | Semi-finalist (placed 2nd in public vote) | Semi-finalist (eliminated)

Golden buzzer
Judges' Pick

Contestant	Age(s)	Hometown	Genre	Act	Semi final	Result
Aerial Amazons	38 & 40	Chonburi	Acrobatics	Aerialists Duo	2	Eliminated
Alisha	5	Bangkok	Gymnastics	Pole Dancer/Gymnast	3	Eliminated (Placed 2nd in Public vote)
Bandai	12-15	Ratchaburi	Acrobatics	Acrobatic Group	3	Runner-up
Chaiyo	9-12	Bueng Kan	Dance	Dance Group	4	Eliminated
Kaiyakam Hmoob Lawj Xeeb	4-27	Chiang Rai	Acrobatics	Acrobatic Group	3	Eliminated
Kiatniyom	6-35	Bangkok	Dance	Popping Dance Group	2	Eliminated (Placed 2nd in Public vote)
KV Family	26-50	Bangkok	Acrobatics	Aerialists Group	4	Winner
Mittraphap Kaneng	26 & 31	Laos	Acrobatics	Aerialists Duo	3	Finalist
Mix Cinema	8-35	Bangkok/Chiang Mai	Comedy	Comedy Act	1	Eliminated
Phakin	7	Bangkok	Music	Drummer	4	Eliminated (Placed 2nd in Public vote)
Pimpaya	21	Bangkok	Singing	Singer	1	Eliminated
Pimpisa	5	Bangkok	Acrobatics	Aerialist	2	Finalist (Won Public Vote)
Ping Lumprapleng	53	Bangkok	Dance	Mime Dancer	3	Eliminated
Piyapong	33	Bangkok	Magic	Mentalist	2	Eliminated
Ploychompoo Payonrat	29	Bangkok	Acrobatics	Aerialist	1	Finalist (Won Judges' Pick)
Psycho	18 & 31	Bangkok	Variety	Comedy Juggler/Danger Act	4	Eliminated
Sabadlai	26-50	Ratchaburi	Variety	Musical Theatre Act	1	Eliminated (Placed 2nd in Public vote)
Satita	14	Bangkok	Singing	Singer	2	Finalist (Won Judges' Pick)
Tabitha King	52	United States	Singing	Singer	4	Finalist (Won Judges' Pick)
Tip Toes by Bangkok Dance Academy	13-20	Bangkok	Dance	Ballet Dance Group	1	Finalist (Won Public Vote)

=== Semifinals summary ===
Buzzed out
Judges' pick
Advanced - Won judges' pick | Advanced - Won public vote
Eliminated - Placed second in the public vote | Eliminated

=== Week 11 - Semi-final 1 (October 15, 2018) ===
Contestant	Order	Act	Buzzes and judges' votes				Result
Contestant	Order	Act	Yuhtlerd	Jennifer	Cris	Pongsak	Result
Mix Cinema	1	Comedy Act					Eliminated
Tip Toes by Bangkok Dance Academy	2	Ballet Dance Group					Advanced
Pimpaya	3	Singer					Eliminated
Sabadlai	4	Musical Theatre Act					Eliminated
Ploychompoo Payonrat	5	Aerialist					Advanced

=== Week 12 - Semi-final 2 (October 22, 2018) ===
Contestant	Order	Act	Buzzes and judges' votes				Result
Contestant	Order	Act	Yuhtlerd	Jennifer	Cris	Pongsak	Result
Aerial Amazons	1	Aerialists Duo					Eliminated
Piyapong	2	Mentalist					Eliminated
Satita	3	Singer					Advanced
Pimpisa	4	Aerialist					Advanced
Kiatniyom	5	Popping Dance Group					Eliminated

=== Week 13 - Semi-final 3 (October 29, 2018) ===
Contestant	Order	Act	Buzzes and judges' votes				Result
Contestant	Order	Act	Yuhtlerd	Jennifer	Cris	Pongsak	Result
Mittraphap Kaneng	1	Aerialists Duo					Advanced
Ping Lumprapleng	2	Mime Dancer					Eliminated
Kaiyakam Hmoob Lawj Xeeb	3	Acrobatic Group					Eliminated
Alisha	4	Pole Dancer/Gymnast					Eliminated
Bandai	5	Acrobatic Group					Advanced

=== Week 14 - Semi-final 4 (November 5, 2018) ===
Contestant	Order	Act	Buzzes and judges' votes				Result
Contestant	Order	Act	Yuhtlerd	Jennifer	Cris	Pongsak	Result
Psycho	1	Comedy Juggler/Danger Act					Eliminated
Phakin	2	Drummer					Eliminated
Tabitha King	3	Singer					Advanced
Chaiyo	4	Dance Group					Eliminated
KV Family	5	Aerialists Group					Advanced

== Final ==
=== Week 15 - Final (November 12, 2018) ===
Winner
Runner-up

Contestant	Order	Act	Result				
Contestant	Order	Act	Result	Pimpisa	1	Aerialist	Top 8
Tip Toes by Bangkok Dance Academy	2	Ballet Dance Group	Top 8				
KV Family	3	Aerialists Group	Winner				
Satita	4	Singer	Top 8				
Mittraphap Kaneng	5	Aerialists Duo	Top 8				
Tabitha King	6	Singer	Top 8				
Ploychompoo Payonrat	7	Aerialist	Top 8				
Bandai	8	Acrobatic Group	Runner-up				
