= Thailand's Got Talent season 4 =

Thailand's Got Talent
- Season 4
- Hosted by: Ketsepsawat Palagawong na Ayutthaya
- Judges: Chalatit Tantiwut; Patcharasri Benjamad; Pornchita na Songkhla; Nitipong Hornak
- Winner: Wheel Chairs Dance
- Runner-up: SL Music

Release
- Original network: THAITV CH3
- Original release: 15 June – 31 August 2014

Season chronology
- Next → Season 5

Thailand's Got Talent season 4 (also known as TGT) was the fourth season of the Thailand's Got Talent reality television series on the Channel 3 television network, and part of the global British Got Talent series. It is a talent show that features singers, dancers, sketch artists, comedians and other performers of all ages competing for the advertised top prize of 10,000,000 Baht (approximately $325,000). The show debuted in June 2014. Thailand is also the fifth country in Asia to license Got Talent series. The four judges Chalatit Tantiwut, Patcharasri Benjamad, Pornchita Na Songkla and Nitipong Hornak join hosts Ketsepsawat Palagawongse na Ayutthaya.

== Broadcast ==
- Audition 6 weeks.
- Semi-final 6 weeks.
- Final 1 weeks.

== Semi-finals ==
=== Semi-finalists ===
Winner
Runner-up
Finalist
Semi-finalist (lost judges' or public vote)

TGT	Name of act	Age(s)	Genre	Act	Semi-final	Result
01	Redlate Band	16 - 18	Singing	Pop Band	1	Eliminated
02	Embrace Studio	18 - 24	Dance	Dance Troupe	1	Eliminated
03	Sunsin	19 & 21	Singing	Singer & Fiddle Player	1	Eliminated (lost judges' vote)
04	Wheelchair Dance	18 - 19	Dance	Wheelchair Dance Troupe	1	Winner
05	The Show	15-25	Music	Marching Band	1	Eliminated
06	Manatchaya Are You	23 - 27	Comedy	Impersonator Groupe	1	Finalist (won judges' vote)
07	Bangkok Wake Up	20 - 24	Music	Traditional/Electronic Musician Group	2	Eliminated
08	Next School	18 - 23	Dance	Cover Dance Troupe	2	Eliminated (lost judges' vote)
09	BKK Group	21 - 29	Music	Drummer Group	2	Eliminated
10	Chomphu & Tuptim	53 & 48	Singing	Singing Duo	2	Finalist (won public vote)
11	Metro Groover	17 - 27	Dance	B-Boy Dance Troupe	2	Finalist (won judges' vote)
12	Tanasit Aksonratsami	28	Singing	Singer-songwriter/Guitarist	2	Eliminated
13	The Return Dance Crew	16 - 22	Dance	Dance Troupe	3	Eliminated
14	Suphot Atsawarattanapakdi	38	Variety	Juggling	3	Eliminated (lost judges' vote)
15	Setup Mountain	23	Dance	Dancing Duo	3	Eliminated
16	Sittipong Rattanapong	37	Gymnastics	Yoga Performer	3	Finalist (won public vote)
17	W4D	17 - 24	Dance	Videomapping Dance Group	3	Finalist (won judges vote)
18	PLS	30 - 32	Singing	Vocal Harmony Group & Pianist	3	Eliminated
19	UD Town Break Beat	15 - 22	Dance	Dance Troupe/Beatbox	4	Finalist (won judges' vote)
20	Bethofean	9	Music	Pianist	4	Eliminated
21	Barflairman	21 - 23	Variety	Bartender Group	4	Eliminated
22	Rakkaeo	19 - 26	Gymnastics	Gymnastic Group	4	Eliminated (lost judges' vote)
23	Thayanan Pongsiri	10	Acrobatics	Aerial Acrobatic	4	Finalist
24	Chakkrapong	5 - 35	Gymnastics	Gymnastic Group	4	Eliminated
25	Triple D	8 - 14	Dance	Dance Troupe	5	Eliminated
26	Sinchai Prakan	14	Music	Flutist	5	Eliminated (lost judges' vote)
27	Kingkanthai	20 - 24	Acrobatics	Acrobatics Group	5	Eliminated
28	Arisa Homkrun	18	Singing	Singer	5	Finalist (won judges' vote)
29	Bar Saphanmai	18 - 36	Acrobatics	Street Workout Group	5	Eliminated
30	The Talento	10 - 11	Singing	Rock Band	5	Finalist (won public vote)
31	G Dragon	7 - 11	Dance	Dance Group	6	Eliminated
32	Yesso	26 - 32	Dance	Electronic Light Dancer	6	Eliminated
33	SL Music	18 -26	Singing	Northern Thailand Traditional Band	6	Runner-up
34	Believe	11	Gymnastics	Gymnastic Duo	6	Finalist (won judges vote)
35	Siam Synchronized	18-27	Swimming	Synchronized Swimming Group	6	Eliminated
36	Bunmee	17-18	Singing	Pop Band	6	Eliminated (lost judges' vote)
