= Vania Larissa =

Indonesian Chinese spiritual singer and beauty queen

- Born: Vania Larissa Tan; 18 November 1995 (age 30); Pontianak, West Kalimantan, Indonesia
- Occupations: Spiritual singer; beauty queen
- Height: 1.70 m (5 ft 7 in)
- Spouse: Wilson Pesik (m. 2015)
- Children: 2
- Beauty pageant titleholder
- Title: Miss Indonesia 2013; Miss World Indonesia 2013
- Years active: 2010–present
- Hair colour: Black
- Major competitions: Indonesia's Got Talent; (Winner); Miss Indonesia 2013; (Winner); Miss World 2013; (Top 10)

Vania Larissa Tan (born 18 November 1995) is an Indonesian Chinese spiritual singer and beauty pageant titleholder. She won the title of Miss Indonesia 2013, and represented Indonesia at Miss World 2013, finishing as a Top 10 finalist.

Larissa is a professional singer who has been singing since the age of nine. She majored in Opera seria and won and a national student singing competition in 2008 and local talent competition in 2010. She was a winner of the Indonesian variety talent show, Indonesia's Got Talent in 2010.

== Early life ==
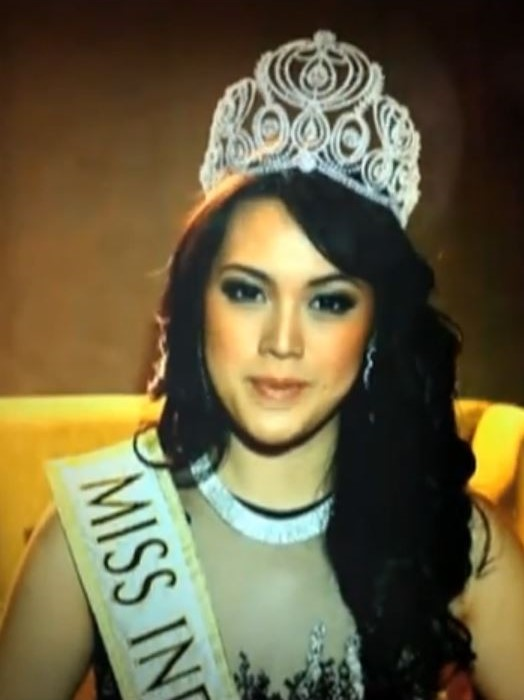
Larissa crowned as Miss Indonesia 2013.

Larrisa was born 18 November 1995 in Pontianak, West Kalimantan, to Liu and Pue Han. She has three elder sisters, Dian Pradana, Elysia Giovanni and Aurhea Catriona. She was educated at Pelita Harapan School, Jakarta.

== Pageantry ==
=== Miss Indonesia 2013 ===
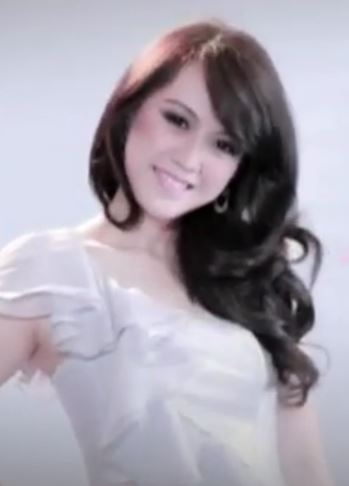
Larissa as Miss Indonesia 2013 contestant.

Larissa represented West Kalimantan at Miss Indonesia 2013 and was crowned by outgoing titleholder Ines Putri Tjiptadi Chandra on 20 February 2013, at the JiExpo, Kemayoran in North Jakarta, competing against 32 other contestants. She held the title from 20 February 2013 until 17 February 2014 before crowning her successor, Maria Asteria Sastrayu Rahajeng.

=== Miss World 2013 ===
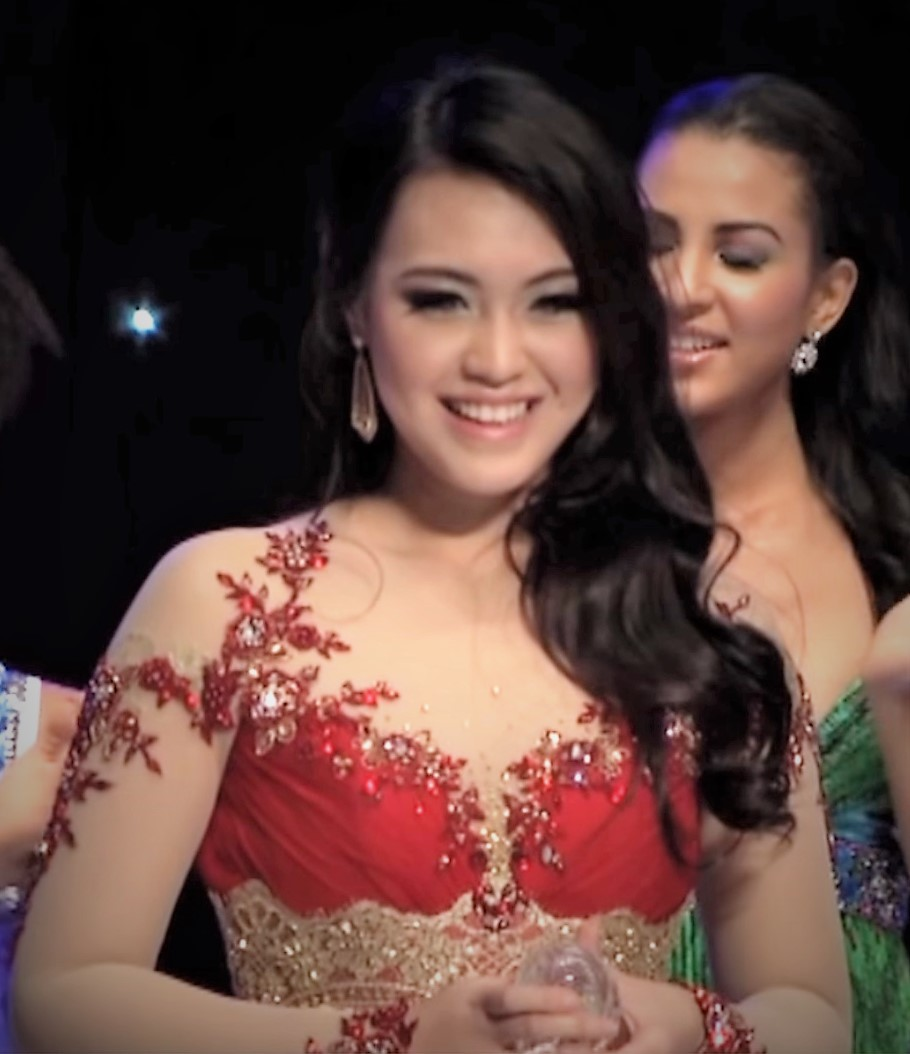
Larissa during Miss World 2013 talent competition.

Her victory in Miss Indonesia 2013 made her a representative for Indonesia in Miss World 2013, and also the host delegate in the pageant. She was a Top 10 semifinalist in Beach Fashion, while winning the Talent Competition. On final night, Larissa scored 172 points for her interview and was ranked 7th overall. She made the Top 10, but failed to make the final cut.

== Personal life ==
In 2015, she married 26 year old Indonesian Chinese businessman, Wilson Pesik, in Bali, and on 5 May 2016, she gave birth to their son.

== Discography ==
=== Studio album ===
Year	Information
2012	KebaikanMu Penuh: Label: Impact Music; Format: CD

=== Compilation album ===
Year	Information
2011	Damai BersamaMu: Label: Music Factory; Format: CD

=== Non-album song ===
- "Rahasia" (2011)

Awards and achievements
Preceded by Ines Putri	Miss Indonesia; 2013	Succeeded by Maria Rahajeng
Preceded by (China) Yu Wenxia	Miss World Talent; 2013	Succeeded by (Malaysia) Dewi Liana Seriestha
