= Thailand's Got Talent season 6 =

Thailand's Got Talent
- Season 6
- Hosted by: Ketsepsawat Palagawong na Ayutthaya
- Judges: Nitipong Hornak; Kathaleeya McIntosh; Patcharasri Benjamad; Chalatit Tantiwut
- Winner: Duo Soul Sister
- Runner-up: Anurak Sreechomphoo

Release
- Original network: THAITV CH3
- Original release: 12 June 2016 – 2016

Season chronology
- ← Previous; Season 5 Next → Season 7

Thailand's Got Talent season 6 (also known as TGT) was the sixth season of the Thailand's Got Talent reality television series on the Channel 3 television network, and part of the global British Got Talent series. It is a talent show that features singers, dancers, sketch artists, comedians and other performers of all ages competing for the advertised top prize of 10,000,000 Baht (approximately $325,000). The show debuted on 12 June 2016. Thailand is also the fifth country in Asia to license Got Talent series. The four judges Chalatit Tantiwut, Patcharasri Benjamad, Kathaleeya McIntosh and Nitipong Hornak join hosts Ketsepsawat Palagawongse na Ayutthaya.

== Broadcast ==
- Audition, 6 weeks
- Culling-day, 1 week
- Semifinal, 5 weeks
- Final, 1 week

== Semifinals ==
=== Semifinalists ===
Winner
Runner-up
Finalist
Semifinalist (lost judges' or public vote)

Golden buzzer
Public wildcard (previously eliminated act reinstated into the final by public vote)

TGT	Name of act	Age(s)	Genre	Act	Hometown	Week	Result
01	The Ambulance	15-16	Band	Rock Band	Bangkok	1	Finalist (won judges' vote)
02	Set Up Mountain	21-25	Dance	Popping Dance Group	Bangkok	1	Eliminated
03	Siam Smai	19-27	Dance	Traditional Videomapping Dance Group	Bangkok	1	Eliminated
04	Fascinating Four	21-23	Singing	Vocal Harmony Group & Pianist	Bangkok	1	Finalist (won public vote)
05	Krittaya Ariyasit	8	Acrobatics	Aerial Acrobatic	Bangkok	1	Eliminated
06	Saeng Si Sin	20-30	Dance	Blacklight Dance Troupe	Bangkok	1	Eliminated (lost judges' vote)
07	Bang Kruai	6-63	Band	Pop Band	Bangkok	2	Eliminated
08	Seangthai Chorus	19-40	Singing	Chorus/Percussion Group	Bangkok	2	Eliminated
09	Prakon	26	Acrobatics	Aerial Acrobatic	Nong Khai	2	Eliminated
10	Magic Mirror	20-30	Dance	Comic Dance Troupe	Bangkok	2	Finalist (won public wildcard)
11	Point Work	11-13	Gymnastics	Contemporary Dance/Gymnastic Group	Bangkok	2	Finalist (won judges' vote)
12	Def-G	16-27	Dance	Dance Troupe	Bangkok	2	Finalist (won public vote)
13	Ampper Group	18-38	Music	Percussion/Musician Group	Bangkok	3	Eliminated
14	YKT	16-25	Dance	Comic Dance Group	Nakhon Ratchasima	3	Eliminated
15	Faet	22	Acrobatics	Aerial Acrobatic Duo	Bangkok	3	Eliminated (lost judges' vote)
16	B-Wicked	24-30	Acrobatics	Balance Board Acrobatic Group	Bangkok	3	Eliminated
17	Alissa Janine Wollmann	18	Singing	Singer/Rapper	Lampang	3	Finalist
18	Nangfa Turbo	15-18	Variety	Stand Cheer Group	Khon Kaen	3	Finalist (won public vote)
19	Sao Sabat	18-25	Band	Country Band	Bangkok	4	Finalist (won judges' vote)
20	UD Town Break Beat	17-25	Dance	B-Boy Dance Troupe/Musician/Beatbox	Udon Thani	4	Eliminated (lost judges' vote)
21	Step Design	19-30	Acrobatics	Acrobatic Group	Bangkok	4	Eliminated
22	Anurak	18	Gymnastics	Contortionist Dancer	Khon Kaen	4	Runner-up
23	Panya & Shih Tzu	29	Animal	Dancing Dog Act	Nakhon Ratchasima	4	Eliminated
24	Power Storm Crew	18-34	Dance	B-Boy Dance Troupe	Phuket	4	Eliminated
25	W4D	20 & 22	Dance	Videomapping Dance Duo	Bangkok	5	Eliminated
26	Brother Green	32 & 34	Dance	Popping Dance Duo	South Korea	5	Eliminated
27	BKK Boyband	15-28	Music	Percussion/Musician Group	Bangkok	5	Finalist (won judges' vote)
28	Opposite	17-23	Singing	Vocal Harmony Group	Bangkok	5	Eliminated (lost judges' vote)
29	Duo Soul Sister	13 & 16	Acrobatics	Aerial Hoop Acrobat Duo	Bangkok	5	Winner
30	Dali Project	20-25	Dance	Dance Troupe	Bangkok	5	Eliminated

Semifinals Summary

Judges' vote

Won the public vote
Won the judges' vote (or public vote if split decision)
Lost the judges' vote (or public vote if split decision)

=== Semifinal 1 (31 July) ===
TGT	Contestant	Act	Buzzes and judges' votes				Result
TGT	Contestant	Act	Nitipong	Kathaleeya	Patcharasri	Chalatit	Result
TGT01	The Ambulance	Rock band					Top 3 (won judges' vote)
TGT02	Set Up Mountain	Popping dance troupe					Eliminated
TGT03	Siam Smai	Thai classical projection dance troupe					Eliminated
TGT04	Fascinating Four	Vocal harmony group/pianist					Top 3 (won public vote)
TGT05	Krittaya	Aerial acrobatic					Eliminated
TGT06	Light Color Art	Blacklight dance troupe					Top 3 (lost judges' vote)

=== Semifinal 2 (7 August) ===
TGT	Contestant	Act	Buzzes and judges' votes				Result
TGT	Contestant	Act	Nitipong	Kathaleeya	Patcharasri	Chalatit	Result
TGT07	Bang Kruai	Pop band/entertainers					Eliminated
TGT08	Seangthai Chorus	Chorus group/percussionist					Eliminated
TGT09	Prakorn Wiraphon	Aerial acrobatic					Eliminated
TGT10	Magic Mirror	Comedy dance troupe					Top 3 (lost judges' vote)
TGT11	Point Work	Contemporary dancers/gymnastic group					Top 3 (won judges' vote)
TGT12	Def-G	Dance troupe					Top 3 (won public vote)

=== Semifinal 3 (14 August) ===
TGT	Contestant	Act	Buzzes and judges' votes				Result
TGT	Contestant	Act	Nitipong	Kathaleeya	Patcharasri	Chalatit	Result
TGT13	Ampper Group	Musician group					Eliminated
TGT14	YKT	Comedy dance troupe					Eliminated
TGT15	Twin	Aerial acrobatic duo					Top 3 (lost judges' vote)
TGT16	B-Wicked	Balance board acrobatic group					Eliminated
TGT17	Alissa Janine Wollmann	Singer/rapper					Top 3 (won judges' vote)
TGT18	Turbo Angel	Stand cheer group					Top 3 (won public vote)

=== Semifinal 4 (21 August) ===
TGT	Contestant	Act	Buzzes and judges' votes				Result
TGT	Contestant	Act	Nitipong	Kathaleeya	Patcharasri	Chalatit	Result
TGT19	Saw Sabat	Country band					Top 3 (won judges' vote)
TGT20	UD Town Break Beat	B-Boy dance troupe					Top 3 (lost judges' vote)
TGT21	Step Design	Acrobatic group					Eliminated
TGT22	Anurak Sreechomphoo	Contortionist dancer					Top 3 (won public vote)
TGT23	Panya & Shih Tzu	Dancing dog act					Eliminated
TGT24	Power Storm Crew	B-Boy dance troupe					Eliminated

=== Semifinal 5 (28 August) ===
TGT	Contestant	Act	Buzzes and judges' votes				Result
TGT	Contestant	Act	Nitipong	Kathaleeya	Patcharasri	Chalatit	Result
TGT25	W4D	Videomapping dance duo					Eliminated
TGT26	Brother Green	Popping dance duo					Eliminated
TGT27	BKK Boyband	Musician group					Top 3 (won judges' vote)
TGT28	Opposite	Vocal harmony group					Top 3 (lost judges' vote)
TGT29	Duo Soul Sister	Aerial hoop duo					Top 3 (won public vote)
TGT30	Dali Project	Dance troupe					Eliminated

== Final (4 September) ==
TGT	Contestant	Act	Result				
TGT	Contestant	Act	Result	TGT01	The Ambulance	Rock band	Top 11
TGT02	Turbo Angel	Stand cheer group	Top 6				
TGT03	Saw Sabat	Country band	Top 11				
TGT04	Fascinating Four	Vocal harmony group/pianist	Top 11				
TGT05	Magic Mirror	Comedic dance troupe	Top 6				
TGT06	Def-G	Dance troupe	Top 11				
TGT07	Anurak Sreechomphoo	Contortionist dancer	Runner-up				
TGT08	Alissa Janine Wollmann	Singer/rapper	Top 6				
TGT09	Duo Soul Sister	Aerial hoop duo	Winner				
TGT10	Point Work	Contemporary dancers/gymnastic group	Top 6				
TGT11	BKK Boyband	Musician group	Top 11				
