= Indonesia's Got Talent =

Indonesian television series

- Genre: Reality television Talent show
- Created by: Simon Cowell
- Presented by: Tora Sudiro; Vincent Rompies; Evan Sanders; Ibnu Jamil; Robby Purba
- Judges: Vina Panduwinata; Anjasmara; Ria Irawan; Indy Barends; Ari Lasso; Anggun; Jay Subiyakto; Rossa; Ivan Gunawan; Denny Sumargo; Reza Oktovian
- Country of origin: Indonesia
- Original language: Indonesian
- No. of series: 4

Production
- Executive producers: Glenn Sims (2010); Harsiwi Achmad (2014); Fabian Dharmawan (2022-2023)
- Production locations: Teater Tanah Airku, TMII, Jakarta (Audition; 2010, 2014); Studio 5 Indosiar, Jakarta (Semifinals, and Finals; 2010); Balai Sarbini, Jakarta (Semifinals and Finals; 2014); Jakarta Concert Hall, iNews Tower, Jakarta (Audition - Grand Finals; 2022)
- Running time: 180-240 minutes
- Production companies: Fremantle; Syco Entertainment

Original release
- Network: Indosiar (2010); SCTV (2014); RCTI (2022-2023); GTV (Note: Only reruns via RCTI.) (2025)
- Release: 23 July 2010 – 14 August 2023

Related
- Got Talent

Indonesia's Got Talent is an Indonesian talent variety show on RCTI (Indosiar in 2010 and SCTV in 2014) that began July 23, 2010. It is based on the Got Talent franchise, an American TV format conceived and owned by Simon Cowell's SYCO company. Indonesia Mencari Bakat, broadcast on Trans TV, was copied from the original Got Talent format. It had higher ratings than the original format, especially in first and third season.

Viewers are able to join through text and online registration via Internet. Auditions are held in key cities such as Surabaya, Medan, Bandung, Jakarta, Palembang, Jogjakarta, Makassar, Padang, Bali, and Banjarmasin.

== Judges, presenters and winners ==
=== Season 1 ===
Indonesia's Got Talent's first appearance was hosted by Tora Sudiro and Vincent Rompies. The judges panel was made up of Indonesian diva Vina Panduwinata, actor Anjasmara, and senior actress Ria Irawan.

The first appearance of Indonesia's Got Talent aired July 23, 2010. This season delayed for two years. This season would supposed to be premiered on 2008.

The first appearance of Indonesia's Got Talent had the winner Vania Larissa, with Rp100,000,000 granted for her.

=== Season 2 ===
In December 2013, FremantleMedia and SCTV announced that season 2 would launch in 2014 with a new host broadcaster on SCTV, new hosts and a stellar line up of judges. Anggun, Ari Lasso, Indy Barends and Jay Subiyakto were the new judging panel and with Evan Sanders and Ibnu Jamil as hosts.

The new look series was based on Britain's Got Talent with X Factor Indonesia and Indonesian Idol Executive Producer, Glenn Sims as show runner and Sacha Watimena (from Pilipinas Got Talent) as Executive Producer. The prize for season two was the biggest ever offered on an Indonesian TV series with an IDR 500,000,000 (approximately $41,000) cash prize for the winner together with a management contract with Sony Entertainment and Syco.

The second season of Indonesia's Got Talent's winner was Putri Ariani. Later on, she competed and got the Golden Buzzer by Cowell on season 18 of America's Got Talent. She placed 4th behind the runners - up, Murmuration and Anna DeGuzman and also this season's winner of the show, Adrian Stoica and Hurricane.

=== Season 3 ===
In February 2022, Fremantle and RCTI announced that season 3 would launch in 2022 with a new host broadcaster on RCTI and would be hosted by Robby Purba, who was also the host of Syco's adoption singing talent show, X Factor Indonesia. The judges panel was made up of Indonesian diva Rossa, fashion designer and television host Ivan Gunawan, actor, television host, and ex-basketball player, Denny Sumargo and Indonesian content creator and YouTuber, Reza Oktovian.

Pasheman 90, as flag hoisting troop dancers are the winner of Indonesia's Got Talent for this appearance. It marked the first time a different talent won, after the two first seasons were won by singers. The winner was granted Rp150.000.000,- and a Hyundai Stargazer vehicle.

=== Season 4 ===
In January 2023, Fremantle and RCTI announce that the season 4 will be launch in 2023. Robby Purba continued his presenting role, and the four judges returned as well. The online auditions was opened on January 21. On April 17, auditions were closed. The studio auditions started on May 3. This season started on June 11 and ended on August 14.

Femme Fatale, as a dancers-magician group were the winner of Indonesia's Got Talent for this season. As winners, they were granted Rp150.000.000, and a car.

== Overview ==
=== First Round (Auditions) ===
It all starts at the audition process, which took place throughout April and May 2010, 2013, February to May 2022, and January to April 2023. The first round was judged by independent judges to choose the best talent and brought them to Jakarta to meet the 3 judges. This phases made 450 best talents going to Jakarta to the next round.

In 2013, 5 major Cities participated on the Audition. Bandung, Jakarta, Surabaya, Medan, and Yogyakarta are the 5 cities that auditioned. Four judges would select the best of the best. 90 best talents are going for 9 slots in the Semi - Finals.

In 2022, the competition was changed. There would be an online and city auditions. The same four judges will be judged and selected the best of the best. 76 best talents would be proceed to the Judge' Cuts.

=== Second Round (Judges'Choice/Cull/Cuts) ===
In the first appearance of Indonesia's Got Talent, thousands of acts have been auditioned. Only hundreds of acts would face the judges' decision. The second round called the "Judges Choice". In this round, top 56 would settle and battle it up for Indonesia's Votes in the Live Semi - Finals.

In the second appearance of Indonesia's Got Talent, thousands of acts have been auditioned. Now, it's the judges turn for made 51 acts from 98 acts that passed on auditions, make it to the Live Semi- Finals, 4 Golden Buzzer recipients included. The total of Semifinalists in that season was 55 Semifinalists. This round called the Judges Cull.

In the third appearance of Indonesia's Got Talent, hundreds of acts have been auditioned. Then, they showcase their talent once again in front of the judges and studio audience. It's the work of the judges to pick several of them for the Quarterfinals.

=== Third Round (Quarterfinals) ===
Quarterfinals was held on September 12, 2022. It was the first time in the Got Talent history franchise, that this round was held without a live show conducted. It was still a conducted taping episodes. 2 episodes were tapped on this round. It was 37 acts that passed the Judge Cuts round, would be performed once again for 18 places in the Semi Final round. And would be also filled with 4 Golden Buzzer auditionees. In the fourth season, 15 slots for the semifinals would be guarantee. And also 5 golden buzzer auditionee.

=== Fourth Round (Live Semi Finals/Top 56/Top 51/Top 22/Top 20) ===
In the first two editions, 56 acts (51 acts in the next edition) would be battled it out for the spot on the live season finale. In the third edition, 22 acts, consists of 18 Quarterfinalists of the two Quarter Finals episode, plus 4 Golden Buzzer from the Auditions, They'll showcase their talents for a spot to the live season finale. In the fourth edition, there are 20 acts consisting of 15 Quarterfinalists from 3 Quarterfinals episodes, plus 5 golden buzzers from the auditions. Top 20 will be compete again for a spot on the next round.

In first two editions, this round held Live, but in the third and fourth edition, it's a taping and not a Live.

=== Fifth Round (Road To Grand Final) ===
This round was the first time used in the Got Talent franchises. This round will be featuring the 10 semifinalists, that qualify in the Semi Finals, that will be performing their act. In this round, it will be a Sudden Death round for the 5 place in the Live Season Finale.

=== Final Round (Live Season Finale) ===
In the first appearance, 6 Grand Finalists that sucsseded for the Grand Finals, will make it through to the season finale. This is the last stage that must they conquered. It was changed in the second appearance. 5 acts would be progressed from 12 Grand Finalists. In the third appearance, it will be changing again. 10 become 5, 5 become 3, 3 become 2, until the host revealing the winner.

== Seasons ==
=== Season 1 ===
The first season began on July 23, 2010. It was held in some major cities in the Indonesia.

=== Season 3 ===
Indonesia's Got Talent season 3 premiered on August 8, 2022.

=== Season 4 ===
The fourth season of Indonesia's Got Talent premiered on June 11, 2023.
