= Danmark Har Talent =

Danish reality TV series

- Created by: Simon Cowell
- Presented by: Talent (2008-2010) Felix Smith Mikkel Herforth Danmark Har Talent (2014-2019) Christopher Læssø; Felix Smith; Cecilie Haugaard; Rasmus Brohave
- Judges: Talent (2008-2010); Hella Joof; Nikolaj Koppel; Jesper Dahl; Julie Steincke; Peter Aalbæk Jensen; Martin Hal; Danmark Har Talent (2014-2019); Jarl Friis-Mikkelsen; Cecilie Lassen; Peter Frödin; Nabiha; TopGunn; Sus Wilkins; Signe Lindkvist; Thomas Buttenschøn; Simon Jul
- Country of origin: Denmark
- No. of seasons: 5 (8) (Including Talent)

Production
- Production location: Denmark

Original release
- Network: TV2
- Release: 31 December 2014 – 23 November 2019

Danmark har talent ("Denmark has Talent", formerly Talent (2008–2010)) is Denmark's version of the Got Talent franchise and was in the same format as Britain's Got Talent. The first series aired in 2014 and was won by beatboxer Thorsen, and the second series aired late 2015 and finished in early 2016. The golden buzzer featured in both series. On the channel DR1 the show Talent was aired from 2008 to 2010. It was delayed in 2011 to 2014, In 2015 TV2 made the new season called Danmark Har Talent. The last season of “Danmark Har Talent”, aired in 2019 and after the season ended TV2 axed the show after 5 seasons on TV2.

== Summary ==
Season	Year	Channel	Winner(s)	Act	Runner-up	Third Place	Hosts	Judges
1	2014	Tv2	Thorsen	Beatboxer	Nini Brothers	Henning Nielsen	Christopher Læssø; Felix Schmidt	Jarl Friis-Mikkelsen; Cecilie Lassen; Peter Frödin; TopGunn
2	2015-2016	Tv2	Matias	Rubik's Cube solver	Dynamic Duo	William	Christopher Læssø; Felix Schmidt	Jarl Friis-Mikkelsen; Cecilie Lassen; Peter Frödin; Nabiha
3	2017	Tv2	Johanne Astrid	Drummer	Mads Fencker	Rasta Mizizi Acrobats	Christopher Læssø; Felix Schmidt	Jarl Friis-Mikkelsen; Cecilie Lassen; Peter Frödin; Nabiha
4	2018	Tv2	Moonlight Brothers	Brothers Dance Duo	Anastasia Skukhtorova	Champions League Family	Christopher Læssø; Felix Schmidt	Jarl Friis-Mikkelsen; Cecilie Lassen; Peter Frödin; Thomas Buttenschøn
5	2019	Tv2	Alex Porsing	Motorcross	Sunny Cagara	Joker & Harley Quinn	Rasmus Brohave; Cecilie Haugaard	Signe Lindkvist; Simon Jul; Peter Frödin; Sus Wilkins

== Season 1 (2014) ==
First series was won by beatboxer Thorsen.

== Season 2 (2015–2016) ==
Second series began on 28 December 2015 and finished in early 2016.

The season was won by Matias, a magician.
