= Danmark Har Talent season 1 =

Danmark Har Talent
- Season 1
- Hosted by: Christopher Læssø and Felix Schmidt
- Judges: Peter Frödin; Topgunn; Cecilie Lassen; Jarl Friis-Mikkelsen
- Winner: Thorsen
- Runner-up: Nini Brothers

Release
- Original network: TV 2
- Original release: 31 December 2014 – 2015

Season chronology
- Next → Season 2

The inaugural season of Danmark Har Talent aired on TV 2 on 31 December 2014 and finished in 2015. The series was hosted by Christopher Læssø and Felix Schmidt. On the judging panel were Jarl Friis-Mikkelsen, Cecilie Lassen, Peter Frödin and TopGunn. In this series the golden buzzer is available for each judge to press once the whole series to put one act straight through to the live shows.

The season was won by 17-year-old Thor Mikkelsen, also known as Thorsen.

== Background ==
It was announced TV 2 will make the first series of the show, to premiere 31 December 2014 and finish early 2015. There was a previous show called Talent, which ran for 3 series from 2010 to 2013.

== Difference To Talent ==
Danmark Har Talent differed from the first three series of Talent because for the first time these a golden buzzer which is used when each judge want to put an act straight through to the live shows, the golden buzzer has been used worldwide in got talent franchise firstly used on das supertalent the German version of the show and Britain's Got Talent British version of got talent. this series for the first time has a 4th judge which each act have to restive three yes's to go through to the next round and 4 x's to stop the act either in the auditions or live shows.

== Semi-final summary ==
Key	Judges vote	Buzzed out	Won the public vote	Won the judges vote	lost the judges vote	wildcard

== Semi Finals 1 ==
Order	Artist	Act	Buzzes				Finished
Order	Artist	Act	Jarl	Cecilie	Topgunn	Peter	Finished
1	Ainda	Singer					Advanced (1st)
2	Camilla Lysdahls	Singer					Eliminated
3	Danish Freestyle Teams	Unicycle Act					Eliminated
4	Danseskolen Frederiksberg	Musical Theater Dance Group					Eliminated
5	Dennis Agerblad Bands	Band					Advanced
6	Nini Brothers	Dancers					Advanced (2nd)
7	Salomon Westerlunds	Singer					Eliminated

== Semi Finals 2 ==
Order	Artist	Act	Buzzes				Finished
Order	Artist	Act	Jarl	Cecilie	Topgunn	Peter	Finished
1	Holger Lundberg	Danger Act					Eliminated
2	Karim And Angelo	Singers And Rappers					Eliminated
3	Peter Farver Nørgaard	Ventriloquist					Advanced (2nd)
4	Roskilde Garden	Band					Eliminated
5	Magnus Labbe	Pole Dancer					Advanced (1st)
6	Trine Munkvad	Twerking Dancer					Eliminated
7	Vuvuzela Kidz	Dance Group					Advanced

== Semi Finals 3 ==
Order	Artist	Act	Buzzes				Finished
Order	Artist	Act	Jarl	Cecilie	Topgunn	Peter	Finished
1	Nanna Gundersen	Singer					Eliminated
2	StylezCrew	Dance Group					Eliminated
3	Henning Nielsen	Magician					Advanced (3rd)
4	Sigmund Trondheim	Dancer					Eliminated
5	Gug Rope Skipping Team	Rope Skipping Act					Eliminated (4th)
6	Daniel Hersig	Singer (Sang Let It Go)					Advanced (2nd)
7	Thorsen	Beatboxer					Advanced (1st)

== Semi Finals 4 ==
Order	Artist	Act	Buzzes				Finished
Order	Artist	Act	Jarl	Cecilie	Topgunn	Peter	Finished
1	Anna Grace	Opera Singer					Advanced (2nd)
2	DTDT	Ninja Sword Group					Eliminated
3	Michael Dyst	Speaker					Eliminated
4	Emilie Brooklyn	Dancer					Eliminated
5	Joy Soldiers	Dance Group					Eliminated
6	Power Puff Drengene	Band					Advanced
7	Henning Vad	Singer					Advanced (1st)

== Final 12 Part 1 ==
Order	Artist	Act	Buzzes				Finished
Order	Artist	Act	Jarl	Cecilie	Topgunn	Peter	Finished
1	Ainda	Singer					Eliminated (4th)
2	Dennis Agerblad Band	Singers					Eliminated
3	Peter Farver Nørgaard	Ventriloquist					Advanced (1st)
4	Magnus Labbe	Pole Dancer					Advanced (3rd)
5	Nini Brothers	Dancers					Advanced (2nd)
6	Vuvuzela Kids	Dance Group					Eliminated

== Final 12 Part 2 ==
Order	Artist	Act	Buzzes				Finished
Order	Artist	Act	Jarl	Cecilie	Topgunn	Peter	Finished
1	Anna Grace	Opera Singer					Eliminated
2	Power Puff Drengene	Band					Eliminated
3	Henning Vad	Singer					Advanced (2nd)
4	Henning Nielsen	Magician					Advanced
5	Daniel Hersig	Singer (Sang "Son of Man" on Danish "Menneskesøn")					Eliminated
6	Thorsen	Beatboxer					Advanced (1st)

== Final ==
Order	Artist	Act	Finished				
Order	Artist	Act	Finished	1	Henning Vad	Singer	5th
2	Magnus Labbe	Pole Dancer	4th				
3	Anna Grace	Opera Singer	6th				
4	Peter Farver Nørgaard	Ventriloquist	7th				
5	Henning Nielson	Magician	3rd				
6	Nini Brothers	Dancers	2nd				
7	Thorsen	Beatboxer	1st				

=== Semi-finalists ===
Winner
Runner-up
Finalist
Final 12

Name of act	Act	Semi-final	Result
Thorsen	Beatboxer	3	Winner
Nini Brothers	Dancers	1	Runner-up
Henning Nielsen	Magician	3	3rd place
Magnus Labbe	Pole Dancer	2	4th place
Henning Vad	Singer	4	5th place
Anna Grace	Opera Singer	4	6th place
Peter Farver Nørgaard	Ventriloquist	2	7th place
Ainda	Singer	1	Final 12
Dennis Agerblad Bands	Band	1	Final 12
Vuvuzela Kidz	Dance Group	2	Final 12
Power Puff Drengene	Band	4	Final 12
Daniel Hersig	Singer	3	Final 12
Camilla Lysdahls	Singer	1	Eliminated
Danish Freestyle Teams	Unicycle Act	1	Eliminated
Danseskolen Frederiksberg	Musical Theater Dance Group	1	Eliminated
Salomon Westerlunds	Singer	1	Eliminated
Holger Lundberg	Danger Act	2	Eliminated
Karim And Angelo	Singers And Rappers	2	Eliminated
Roskilde Garden	Band	2	Eliminated
Trine Munkvad	Twerking Dancers	2	Eliminated
Nanna Gundersen	Singer	3	Eliminated
StylezCrew	Dance Group	3	Eliminated
Sigmund Trondheim	Dance Group	3	Eliminated
Gug Rope Skipping Team	Rope Skipping Act	3	Eliminated
DTDT	Ninja Sword Act	4	Eliminated
Michael Dyst	Speaker	4	Eliminated
Joy Soldiers	Dance Group	4	Eliminated
