= International Date Line =

Line dividing one calendar day from the next

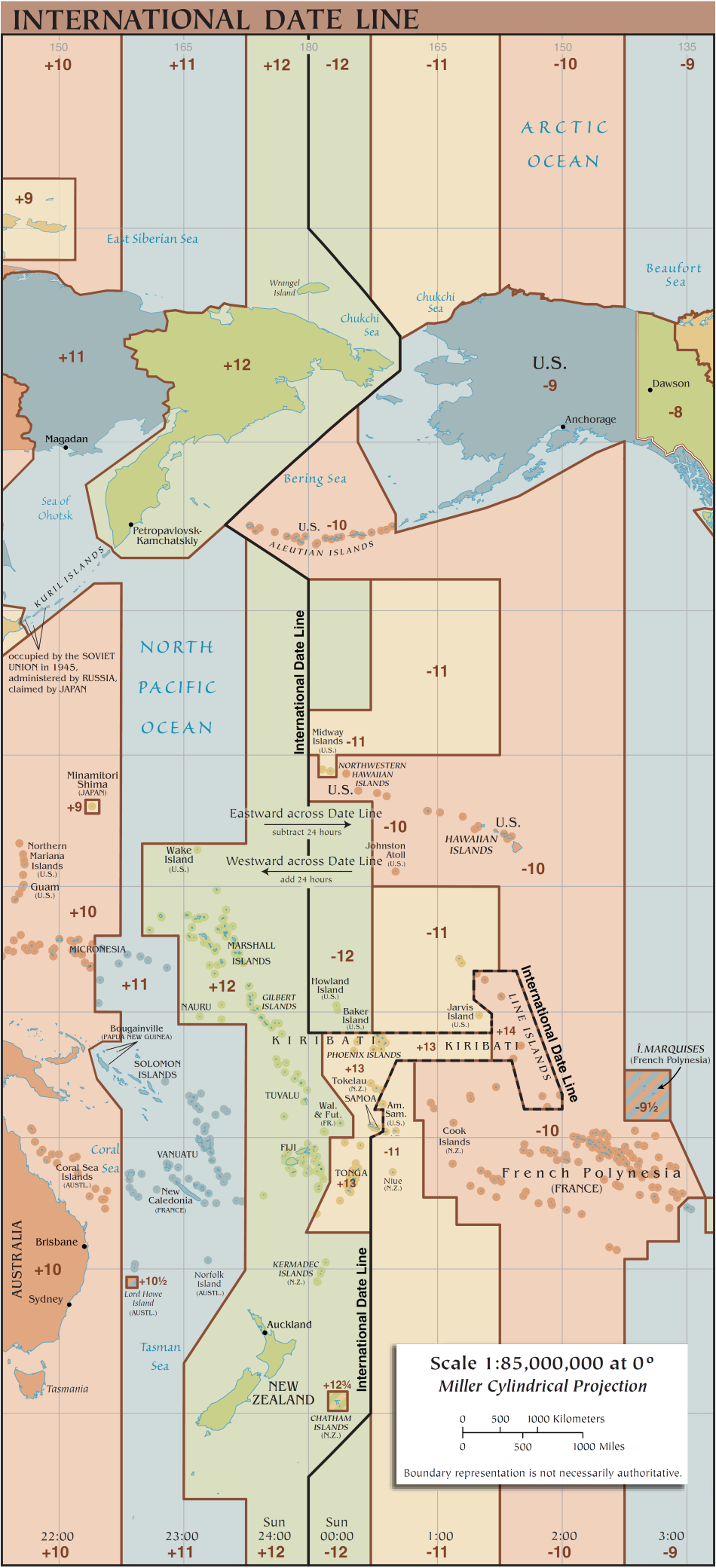
The International Date Line around the antimeridian (180° longitude)

The International Date Line (IDL) is the line extending between the North and South Poles that is the boundary between one calendar day and the next. It passes through the Pacific Ocean, roughly following the 180.0° line of longitude and deviating to pass around some territories and island groups. Crossing the date line eastbound decreases the date by one day, while crossing the date line westbound increases the date.

The line is a cartographic convention and is not defined by international law. This has made it difficult for cartographers to agree on its precise course and has allowed countries through whose waters it passes to move it at times for their convenience.

== Geography ==
A simplified illustration of the relation between the International Date Line, the date, and the time of day. Each color represents a different date.

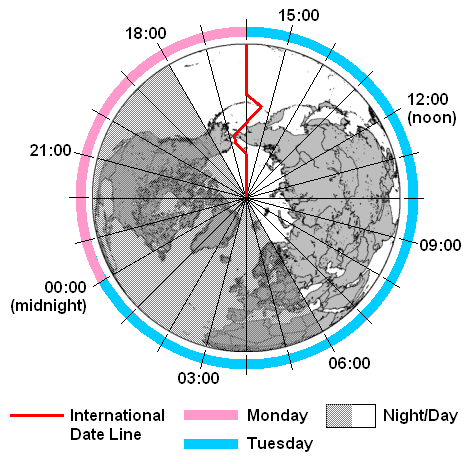
Example depicting situation at 04:00 GMT Tuesday. (Times are approximate, since time zone boundaries generally do not exactly coincide with meridians. Night and day is illustrative only; daylight hours depend on latitude and time of year.)

=== Circumnavigating the globe ===
People traveling westward around the world must set their clocks:

- Back by one hour for every 15° of longitude crossed, and
- Forward by 24 hours upon crossing the International Date Line.

People traveling eastward must set their clocks:

- Forward by one hour for every 15° of longitude crossed, and
- Back by 24 hours upon crossing the International Date Line.

Moving forward or back 24 hours generally also implies a one day date change.

=== Description ===
The IDL is roughly based on the meridian of 180° longitude, roughly down the middle of the Pacific Ocean, and halfway around the world from the IERS Reference Meridian, the successor to the historic Greenwich prime meridian running through the Royal Greenwich Observatory. In many places, the IDL follows the 180° meridian exactly. In other places, however, the IDL deviates east or west away from that meridian. These various deviations generally accommodate the political and economic affiliations of the affected areas.

Proceeding from north to south, the first deviation of the IDL from 180° is to pass to the east of Wrangel Island and the Chukchi Peninsula, the easternmost part of Russian Siberia. (Wrangel Island lies directly on the meridian at 71°32′N 180°0′E, also noted as 71°32′N 180°0′W.) It then passes through the Bering Strait between the Diomede Islands at a distance of 1.5 kilometres (0.93 mi) from each island at 168°58′37″ W. It then bends considerably west of 180°, passing west of St. Lawrence Island and St. Matthew Island.

The IDL crosses between the U.S. Aleutian Islands (Attu Island being the westernmost) and the Commander Islands, which belong to Russia. It then bends southeast again to return to 180°. Thus, all of Russia is to the west of the IDL, and all of the United States is to the east except for the insular areas of Guam, the Northern Mariana Islands, and Wake Island, reaching the hypothetical, but not used UTC−13:00 time zone.

The IDL remains on the 180° meridian until passing the equator. Two U.S.-owned uninhabited atolls, Howland Island and Baker Island, just north of the equator in the central Pacific Ocean (and ships at sea between 172.5°W and 180°), have the earliest (Note: Earliest time on Earth here means that calendar day and clock time in this time zone is least advanced (or the "oldest ") on Earth and that this place is the last (latest ) on Earth to reach any day and time. Because of that this time zone (IDLW) is sometimes also called Anywhere on Earth and deadlines can be set based on it e.g. "until the end of day Anywhere on Earth" means that if the day ended there it also ended everywhere else on the planet before that.) time on Earth (UTC−12:00 hours).

The IDL circumscribes Kiribati by swinging far to the east, almost reaching the 150°W meridian. Kiribati's easternmost islands, the southern Line Islands south of Hawaii, have the latest (Note: Latest time on Earth here means that calendar day and clock time in this time zone is most advanced (or the "newest") on Earth and that this place is the first (earliest) on Earth to reach any day and time.) time on Earth (UTC+14:00 hours).

South of Kiribati, the IDL returns westward but remains east of 180°, passing between Samoa and American Samoa. Accordingly, Samoa, Tokelau, Wallis and Futuna, Fiji, Tonga, Tuvalu, and New Zealand's Kermadec Islands and Chatham Islands are all west of the IDL and have the same date. American Samoa, the Cook Islands, Niue, and French Polynesia are east of the IDL and one day behind.

The IDL then bends southwest to return to 180°. It follows that meridian until reaching Antarctica, which has multiple time zones. Conventionally, the IDL is not drawn into Antarctica on most maps. (See § Cartographic practice and convention below.)

=== Facts dependent on the IDL ===
According to the clock, the first areas to experience a new day and a New Year are islands that use UTC+14:00. These include portions of the Republic of Kiribati, including Millennium Island and Kiritimati in the Line Islands. The first major cities to experience a new day are Auckland and Wellington, New Zealand (UTC+12:00 or UTC+13:00 during daylight saving time).

A 1994 realignment of the IDL made Caroline Island one of the first points of land on Earth to reach 1 January 2000, on the calendar (UTC+14:00). As a result, this atoll was renamed Millennium Island.

Every day for 2 hours from 10:00 to 12:00 UTC there are 3 different days on Earth. Example: On Tuesday 10:33 UTC it is Monday 22:33 on Baker Island (US), 23:33 on Midway (US), Pago Pago (American Samoa) and Alofi (Niue), Tuesday almost everywhere else on Earth and Wednesday 00:33 in Kiritimati (Kiribati) in the Line Islands. Then 1 hour 11 minutes later at 11:44 UTC it is Monday 23:44 on Baker Island, Tuesday almost everywhere else on Earth, Wednesday 01:44 in Kiritimati and 00:44 in Canton Island (Kiribati) in the Phoenix Islands, Apia (Samoa), Atafu (Tokelau) and Nukuʻalofa (Tonga) (also in Auckland during summer when NZDT is observed). Chatham Islands (NZ) are also nominally 2 days ahead of Baker Island for 45 minutes in the winter (CHAST) and 1 hour 45 minutes in the summer (CHADT).

The areas that are the first to see the daylight of a new day vary by the season. Around the June solstice, the first area would be any place within the Kamchatka Time Zone (UTC+12:00) that is far enough north to experience midnight sun on the given date. At the equinoxes, the first place to see daylight would be the uninhabited Millennium Island in Kiribati, which is the easternmost land located west of the IDL.

Near the December solstice, the first places would be Antarctic research stations using New Zealand Time (UTC+13:00) during summer that experience midnight sun. These include Amundsen-Scott South Pole Station, McMurdo Station, Scott Base and Zucchelli Station.

== De facto and de jure date lines ==
There are two ways time zones and thereby the location of the International Date Line are determined: one on land and adjacent territorial waters, and the other on open seas.

All nations unilaterally determine their standard time zones, applicable only on land and adjacent territorial waters. This date line can be called de facto since it is not based on international law, but on national laws. These national zones do not extend into international waters.

The nautical date line, not the same as the IDL, is a de jure construction determined by international agreement. It is the result of the 1917 Anglo-French Conference on Time-keeping at Sea, which recommended that all ships, both military and civilian, adopt hourly standard time zones on the high seas. The United States adopted its recommendation for U.S. military and merchant marine ships in 1920. This date line is implied but not explicitly drawn on time zone maps. It follows the 180° meridian except where it is interrupted by territorial waters adjacent to land, forming gaps—it is a pole-to-pole dashed line. The 15° gore that is offset from UTC by 12 hours is bisected by the nautical date line into two 7.5° gores that differ from UTC by ±12 hours.

In theory, ships are supposed to adopt the standard time of a country if they are within its territorial waters within 12 nautical miles (14 mi; 22 km) of land, then revert to international time zones (15° wide pole-to-pole gores) as soon as they leave. In practice, ships use these time zones only for radio communication and similar purposes. For internal (within-ship) purposes, such as work and meal hours, ships use a time zone of their own choosing.

=== Cartographic practice and convention ===
The IDL on the map in this article and all other maps is based on the de facto line and is an artificial construct of cartographers, as the precise course of the line in international waters is arbitrary. The IDL does not extend into Antarctica on the world time zone maps by the United States Central Intelligence Agency (CIA) or the United Kingdom's His Majesty's Nautical Almanac Office (HMNAO). The IDL on modern CIA maps now reflects the most recent shifts in the IDL. The current HMNAO map does not draw the IDL in conformity with recent shifts in the IDL; it draws a line virtually identical to that adopted by the UK's Hydrographic Office about 1900. Instead, HMNAO labels island groups with their time zones, which do reflect the most recent IDL shifts. This approach is consistent with the principle of national and nautical time zones: the islands of eastern Kiribati are actually "islands" of Asian date (west side of IDL) (Note: Asian date, also referred to as the date of the Eastern Hemisphere, is a descriptive term for the calendar date observed in locations on the western side of the International Date Line (IDL), particularly throughout Asia and much of the Western Pacific. It generally refers to the date that is one calendar day ahead of places located immediately east of the International Date Line, such as parts of the central Pacific. For example, when it is Sunday in Hawaii, it may already be Monday in the Philippines, Japan, China, and other Asian countries.) in a sea of American date (east side of IDL). (Note: American Date, also called the Date of the Western Hemisphere, refers to the calendar date observed in locations on the eastern side of the International Date Line (IDL), particularly in the Americas and other regions of the Western Hemisphere. It is the date on the side of the IDL where the calendar day is generally one day behind the date observed on the opposite, western side of the IDL.) Similarly, the western Aleutian Islands are islands of American date in a sea of Asian date.

No international organization, nor any treaty between nations, has fixed the IDL drawn by cartographers: the 1884 International Meridian Conference explicitly refused to propose or agree to any time zones, stating that they were outside its purview. The conference resolved that the Universal Day, midnight-to-midnight Greenwich Mean Time (now redefined and updated as Coordinated Universal Time, or UTC), which it did agree to, "shall not interfere with the use of local or standard time where desirable". From this comes the utility and importance of UTC or "Z" ("Zulu") time: it permits a single universal reference for time that is valid for all points on the globe at the same moment.

== History ==
The 14th-century Arab geographer Abulfeda predicted that circumnavigators would accumulate a one-day offset to the local date. This phenomenon was confirmed in 1522 at the end of the Magellan–Elcano expedition, the first successful circumnavigation. After sailing westward around the world from Spain, the expedition called at Cape Verde for provisions on Wednesday, 9 July 1522 (ship's time). However, the locals told them that it was actually Thursday, 10 July 1522. The crew was surprised, as they had recorded each day of the three-year journey without omission. Cardinal Gasparo Contarini, the Venetian ambassador to Spain, was the first European to give a correct explanation of the discrepancy.

=== Historic alterations ===
==== Philippines (1521 and 1844) ====
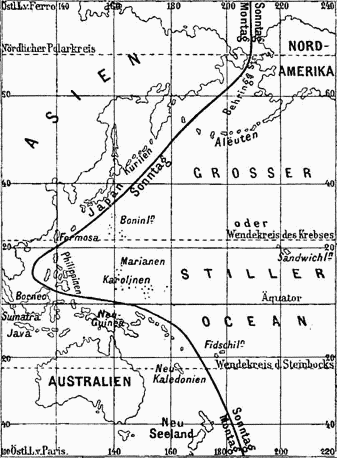
Erroneous International Date Line from the 1888 Encyclopædia the Meyers Konversations-Lexikon, running between the Spanish Philippine Islands and British Hong Kong. The Philippine Islands and the rest of New Spain are shown on the eastern side of the IDL, even though they were moved to the western side in 1845. Also placed to the east of the IDL were the Bonin Islands and Fiji, which are actually to the west of the line.

Ferdinand Magellan claimed the Philippines for Spain on Saturday, 16 March 1521, having sailed westward from Seville across the Atlantic Ocean and the Pacific Ocean. As part of New Spain, the Philippines had its most important communication with Acapulco in Mexico, so it was on the eastern side of the IDL despite being on the western edge of the Pacific Ocean. As a result, the Philippines was one day behind its Asian neighbours for 323 years, 9 months and 4 days (Note: Within the Papal Bull of Pope Gregory XIII that mandated the introduction of the Gregorian calendar in 1582. Italy, Portugal, and Spain (including its overseas possessions like the Philippines, and the Americas) skipped 10 days to make the process of a calendrical switch from the Julian to the Gregorian calendar. Thursday, October 4, was followed by Friday, October 15, 1582. Because the Julian calendar acknowledged a leap year day and the Gregorian calendar did not during centennial years (ending with “00”), the Julian calendar fell one day further behind, bringing the difference to 11 days from March 1 (O.S. February 19), 1700 until February 28 (O.S. February 17), 1800, and another one day to 12 days from March 1 (O.S. February 18), 1800 to February 28 (O.S. February 16), 1900; the count of excess days became considered as only 4 instead of 14, to acknowledge the 10 days that the Philippines lose during the period when it was using the American date.) from Saturday, 16 March 1521 (Julian Calendar) until Monday, 30 December 1844 (Gregorian Calendar).

After Mexico gained independence from Spain on 27 September 1821, Philippine trade interests turned to Imperial China, the Dutch East Indies and adjacent areas, so the Philippines decided to join its Asian neighbours on the west side of the IDL. Governor-general Narciso Claveria consulted the Archbishop of Manila, Jose Segui, about fixing the time discrepancy of the Philippines compared to its Asian neighbors, to fix and ease the trade for the economic sustenance of the territory. To advance the calendar by one day, on 16 August 1844, Claveria ordered that Tuesday, 31 December 1844 should be removed from the calendar. Monday, 30 December 1844 was followed immediately by Wednesday, 1 January 1845. The change also applied to the other remaining Spanish colonies in the Pacific: the Caroline Islands, Guam, Mariana Islands, Marshall Islands and Palau as part of the Captaincy General of the Philippines. European publications were generally unaware of this change until the early 1890s, so they erroneously gave the International Date Line a large western bulge for the next half century.

==== Pitcairn Islands (1790 and 1814) ====
When Fletcher Christian and the mutineers of HMS Bounty settled on the Pitcairn Islands in January 1790, they arrived by sailing eastward from Tahiti. Because they traveled east across what would eventually become the date line without subtracting a day from their logbooks, their calendar became desynchronized. For 24 years, the isolated community lived one full day ahead of the rest of the world (e.g., they kept Sunday on what was actually Saturday according to European nautical tracking).

On 17 September 1814, two British warships, HMS Briton and HMS Tagus, unexpectedly arrived at the island. The captains immediately noticed the calendar error. Because the British navy kept logs relative to European westward exploration, they officially corrected the island's date, winding the calendar back by one day to align with Greenwich and Western hemisphere reckoning.

==== Tahiti & French Polynesia (1797 and 1846) ====
On 5 March 1797, missionaries of the London Missionary Society arrived on Tahiti from England. They had first tried to pass Cape Horn, but failing that, went along Cape of Good Hope and the Indian Ocean instead. As such, they introduced the date of the eastern hemisphere on the island. It was not until the ending of the Franco-Tahitian War and the restoration of the French Protectorate over the Tahitian Kingdom (which Tahitian nationalists had tried to fight off for two years of intense war with more than 1000 deaths) that the French commissioner Armand Joseph Bruat and the regent of the Tahitian Kingdom Paraita ordered that Tahiti had to follow the western hemisphere on 29 December 1846.

==== Cook Islands (1820s and 1899) ====
In the 1820s, Christian missionaries from the London Missionary Society arrived from Australia and New Zealand to evangelize the Cook Islands. When they sailed eastward across the Pacific, they failed to adjust their calendars for crossing what would eventually be designated as the International Date Line. As a result, the Cook Islands mistakenly operated on Asiatic/Eastern dates (the same calendar day as New Zealand and Australia). Because they were located at 160°W longitude—deep within the Western/American hemisphere—their calendar was technically one day ahead of its geographical location. For decades, the locals observed Sunday on what was actually Saturday in the local time zone. This clerical error created a unique dynamic when Seventh-day Adventist missionaries arrived from America in the 1890s. Because the Adventists calculated their Saturday Sabbath using the correct geographical Western time, both the Adventists and the mainstream Sunday-keeping Christians wound up worshipping on the exact same physical day.

By the late 19th century, the expansion of maritime trade and growing administrative connections with neighboring eastern territories (like Tahiti) made the chronological discrepancy unsustainable. To correct the calendar and align with the American side of the Pacific, the British Resident of Rarotonga, Lieutenant-Colonel Gudgeon, enacted the Christmas Day Act of 1899. To shift the International Date Line to the west of the islands and subtract a day, the Cook Islands repeated Christmas Day. Monday, 25 December 1899 was celebrated on its original Asiatic schedule. The next day, instead of becoming Tuesday, 26 December, was legally ordered to be Monday, 25 December 1899 all over again (on Western/American time). This successfully pushed the Cook Islands into the Western hemisphere's calendar.

==== Niue (1830 and 1899) ====
The root of Pacific dateline anomalies began when European missionaries first arrived on the island. When British missionaries from the London Missionary Society landed in Niue in 1830 and 1842, they arrived by sailing eastward from Sydney, Australia. Because the concept of an official International Date Line had not yet been established internationally, the missionaries maintained their original calendar count from Australia. As a result, they unknowingly pushed an Asian/Australasian day reckoning too far east. This meant Niue (along with the neighboring Cook Islands) was operating one day ahead of its actual geographical placement relative to the Americas.

By the late 19th century, global colonial dynamics shifted. As Britain expanded its influence in the South Pacific, the Western calendar needed to match naval and imperial trade paths. In 1899, just before Niue officially became a British protectorate (and was subsequently annexed under New Zealand administration in 1901), it was ordered to cross the International Date Line to the eastern side. To correct the calendar error introduced by the early missionaries, Niue had to adjust its date backward by one day. Nearby Cook Islands famously achieved this by celebrating Christmas twice in 1899 to successfully fall back a day. This move legally placed Niue in the Western Hemisphere’s day cycle (UTC−11:00), cementing its status as one of the final time zones of the calendar day.

==== Alaska (1867) ====
Alaska was on the western side of the International Date Line, since Russian settlers reached Alaska from Siberia. In addition, the Russian Empire was still using the Julian calendar, which had fallen 12 days behind the Gregorian calendar. In 1867, the United States purchased Russian America and moved the territory to the east side of the International Date Line. The transfer ceremony took place at 3:30 p.m. local mean time (00:31 GMT) in the capital of New Archangel (Sitka), on Saturday, 7 October (Julian), which was Saturday, 19 October (Gregorian) in Europe. Since Alaska moved to the eastern side of the International Date Line, the date and time also moved back to 3:30 p.m. local time Friday, 18 October (00:31 GMT Saturday), now known as Alaska Day.

==== Samoan Islands and Tokelau (1892 and 2011) ====
The Samoan Islands, now divided into Samoa and American Samoa, were on the west side of the IDL until 1892. In that year, King Mālietoa Laupepa was persuaded by American traders to adopt the American date (three hours behind California) to replace the former Asian date (four hours ahead of Japan). The change was made by repeating Monday, 4 July 1892, American Independence Day.

In 2011, Samoa returned to the west side of the IDL by removing Friday, 30 December 2011 from its calendar. This changed the time zone from UTC−11:00 to UTC+13:00 (UTC−10 to UTC+14 DST). Samoa made the change because Australia and New Zealand have become its biggest trading partners, and also have large communities of expatriates. Being 21 hours behind made business difficult because having weekends on backward days meant only four days of the week were shared workdays.

The IDL now passes between Samoa and American Samoa, which remains on the east (American) side of the line.

Tokelau is a territory of New Zealand north of Samoa whose principal transportation and communications links with the rest of the world pass through Samoa. For that reason, Tokelau crossed the IDL along with Samoa in 2011, albeit strictly speaking 1 hour later, as they did not do Summer Time (Daylight Saving Time in American English), which Samoa did then.

==== Kwajalein (c. 1945 and 1993) ====
Kwajalein atoll, like the rest of the Marshall Islands, passed from Spanish to German to Japanese control during the nineteenth and twentieth centuries. During that period it was west of the IDL. Although Kwajalein formally became part of the Trust Territory of the Pacific Islands with the rest of the Marshalls after World War II, the United States established a military installation there. Because of that, Kwajalein used the same date as Hawaii, so it was technically across the International Date Line (unlike the rest of Marshalls, in other words, it was one day behind the rest of Marshalls). Kwajalein returned to the west side of the IDL by removing Saturday, 21 August 1993 from its calendar. Moreover, Kwajalein's work week was changed to Tuesday through Saturday to match the Hawaiian work week of Monday through Friday on the other side of the IDL.

==== Eastern Kiribati (1994) ====
As a British colony, the Kiribati colony was centered in the Gilbert Islands, just west of the IDL of the time. Upon independence in 1979, it acquired the claim to the Phoenix and Line Islands, east of the IDL, from the United States. As a result, the country straddled the IDL. Government and commercial concerns on opposite sides of the line could only conduct routine business by radio or telephone on the four days of the week which were weekdays on both sides. To eliminate this anomaly, Kiribati introduced a change of date for its eastern half by removing Saturday, 31 December 1994 from its calendar. Because of this, Friday, 30 December 1994, was followed by Sunday, 1 January 1995. After the change, the IDL in effect moved eastward to go around the entire country. Strictly legal, the 1917 nautical IDL convention is still valid. For example, when it is Monday on Kiribati's islands, it is still Sunday in the surrounding ocean, though maps are usually not drawn this way.

As a consequence of the 1994 change, Kiribati's easternmost territory, the Line Islands, including the inhabited island of Kiritimati (Christmas Island), started the year 2000 before any other country, a feature upon which the Kiribati government capitalized as a potential tourist draw.

== Date lines according to religious principles ==
=== Christianity ===
Generally, the Christian calendar and Christian churches recognize the IDL. Christmas, for example, is celebrated on 25 December (according to either the Gregorian or the Julian calendar, depending upon which of the two is used by the particular church) as that date falls in countries located on either side of the IDL. Thus, whether it is Western Christmas or Orthodox Christmas, Christians in Samoa, immediately west of the IDL, will celebrate the holiday a day before Christians in American Samoa, which is immediately east of the IDL.

A problem with the general rule above arises in certain Christian churches that solemnly observe a Sabbath day as a particular day of the week, when those churches are located in countries near the IDL. Notwithstanding the difference in dates, the same sunrise happened over American Samoa as happens over Samoa a few minutes later, and the same sunset happens over Samoa as happened over American Samoa a few minutes earlier. In other words, the secular days are legally different but they are physically the same; that causes questions to arise under religious law. Because the IDL is an arbitrary imposition, the question can arise as to which Saturday on either side of the IDL (or, more fundamentally, on either side of 180 degree longitude) is the "real" Saturday. This issue (which also arises in Judaism) is a particular problem for Seventh-day Adventists, Seventh Day Baptists, and similar churches located in countries near the IDL.

In Tonga, Seventh-day Adventists (who usually observe Saturday, the seventh-day Sabbath) observe Sunday because Tonga lies east of the 180° meridian. Sunday as observed in Tonga (west of the IDL, as with Kiribati, Samoa, and parts of Fiji and Tuvalu) is considered by the Seventh-day Adventist Church to be the same day as Saturday observed east of the IDL.

Most Seventh-day Adventists in Samoa planned to observe Sabbath on Sunday after Samoa's crossing the IDL in December 2011, but SDA groups in Samatau village and other places (approximately 300 members) decided to accept the IDL adjustment and observe the Sabbath on Saturday. Debate continues within the Seventh-day Adventist community in the Pacific as to which day is really the seventh-day Sabbath.

The Samoan Independent Seventh-day Adventist Church, which is not affiliated to the worldwide Seventh-day Adventist Church, has decided to continue worshiping on Saturday, after a six-day week at the end of 2011.

=== Islam ===
The Islamic calendar and Muslim communities recognize the convention of the IDL. In particular, the day for holding the Jumu'ah prayer appears to be local Friday everywhere in the world. (Note: There has been some discussion that the meridian directly opposite Mecca, approximately 140°W, would be an appropriate date line for Islam. See Deen, S.M. "Ramadan and Prayer Times in the Lands under Midnight Sun". Science Digest for Muslim Thinkers. However, this appears to be an unusual, or at least only a theoretical, position. Muslims in areas that would be affected, such as Alaska and Hawaii, in fact hold Jumu'ah on local Friday, not local Thursday.) The IDL is not a factor in the start and end of Islamic lunar months. These depend solely on sighting the new crescent moon. As an example, the fasts of the month of Ramadan begin the morning after the crescent is sighted. That this day may vary in different parts of the world is well known in Islam.

=== Judaism ===
The concept of an International Date Line in Jewish law is first mentioned by 12th-century decisors. But it was not until the introduction of improved transportation and communications systems in the 20th century that the question of an International Date Line truly became a question of practical Jewish law. (Note: The fleeing of Jewish refugees, including members of the Mir Yeshiva, from the Nazis to China and Japan during World War II was a major impetus to the codification of this aspect of Jewish law. Many of the modern-era opinions cited in and were produced in response to this situation.)

As a practical matter, the conventional International Date Line—or another line in the Pacific Ocean close to it—serves as a de facto date line for purposes of Jewish law, at least in existing Jewish communities. For example, residents of the Jewish communities of Japan, New Zealand, Hawaii, and French Polynesia all observe Shabbat on local Saturday. However, there is not unanimity as to how Jewish law reaches that conclusion. For this reason, some authorities rule that certain aspects of Sabbath observance are required on Sunday (in Japan and New Zealand) or Friday (in Hawaii and French Polynesia) in addition to Saturday. Additionally, there are differences of opinion as to which day or days individual Jews traveling in the Pacific region away from established Jewish communities should observe Shabbat.

For individuals crossing the IDL, the change of calendar date influences some aspects of practice under Jewish law. Yet other aspects depend on an individual's experience of sunsets and sunrises to count days, notwithstanding the calendar date.

== Cultural references and traditions ==
=== Line-crossing ceremonies relating to the IDL ===
Ceremonies aboard ships to mark a sailor's or passenger's first crossing of the Equator, as well as crossing the International Date Line, have been long-held traditions in navies and in other maritime services around the world.

=== In fiction ===
- Edgar Allan Poe utilized the concept to create a paradox in his 1841 short story "Three Sundays in a Week", in which two navy captains circumnavigate the world in different directions and meet on a Sunday. One captain concludes that it is Saturday and the other concludes that it is Monday.
- Francis Bret Harte referred to the concept in his 1867 poem "The Lost Galleon", about a Spanish galleon sailing between Acapulco and Manila in 1641 (a time when the de facto date line was west of the Philippines and Asia, making the poem historically inaccurate).
- In Jules Verne's novel Around the World in Eighty Days (1873), the main protagonist, Phileas Fogg, travels eastward around the world, betting with his friends that he could do it in 80 days. His servant Jean Passepartout keeps his watch set to London time during the journey. To win the wager, Fogg must return by 8:45 p.m. on Saturday, 21 December 1872. However, the journey suffers a series of delays and when Fogg reaches London, he believes it is 8:50 p.m. on Saturday, 21 December and that he has lost the wager by a margin of only five minutes. The next day, however, it is revealed that the day is Saturday, not Sunday, and Fogg arrives at his club just in time to win the bet. Verne explains that "while Phileas Fogg, going eastward, saw the sun pass the meridian eighty times, his friends in London only saw it pass the meridian seventy-nine times."
- In Umberto Eco's novel The Island of the Day Before (1994), the protagonist finds himself on a becalmed ship, with an island close at hand on the other side of the IDL. Unable to swim, the protagonist indulges in increasingly imaginative speculation regarding the physical, metaphysical and religious importance of the IDL.
