= Danmark Har Talent season 2 =

Danmark Har Talent
- Season 2
- Hosted by: Christopher Læssø and Felix Schmidt
- Judges: Jarl Friis-Mikkelsen; Cecilie Lassen; Peter Frödin; Nabiha
- Winner: Matias
- Runner-up: Dynamic Duo

Release
- Original network: TV2
- Original release: 28 December 2015 – 2016

Season chronology
- ← Previous; Season 1 Next → Season 3

The second season of Danmark har talent aired on TV2 on 28 December 2015 and will finish in 2016. The series will be again host by Christopher Læssø and Felix Schmidt. On the judging panel Jarl Friis-Mikkelsen, Cecilie Lassen and Peter Frödin will return with new forth judge Nabiha while TopGunn won't return for his second season. Once again in this season the golden buzzer is available for each judge to press once the whole series to put one act straight through to the live shows.

The season was won by Matias, a magician.

== Background ==
It was announced Tv2 will make a second season of the show. It broadcast on 28 December 2015 and will finish early 2016

== Host and judges ==
The season host once again are Christopher Læssø and Felix Schmidt and the judges Jarl Friis-Mikkelsen, Cecilie Lassen and Peter Frödin with new forth judge Nabiha. TopGunn won't return for his second season.

== Semi-finals ==
The semi finals will begin on 9 February 2016. 7 acts will perform every week. 2 acts will advanced from the public vote 1 act will advanced from the judges vote

== Semi-final summary ==
Key	Judges vote	Buzzed out	Won the public vote	Won the judges vote	Lost the judges vote

== Semi Finals 1 ==
Order	Artist	Act	Buzzes				Finished
Order	Artist	Act	Jarl	Cecilie	Peter	Nabiha	Finished
1	Rainy Day	Band					(Lost Judges' Vote)
2	Marcos Bessa	Singer (Sang Dancing on My Own)					(Won Judges' Vote)
3	Mads & Mathilde	Dance Duo					Eliminated
4	Jimmy Enoch	Unicyclist and Balancer					Eliminated
5	Mads And Andre	Magicians					Eliminated
6	William	Pianist					1st (Won Public Vote)
7	Kompaoni Stor	Dance Group					2nd (Won Public Vote)

== Semi Finals 2 ==
Order	Artist	Act	Buzzes				Finished
Order	Artist	Act	Jarl	Cecilie	Peter	Nabiha	Finished
1	Motus	Acrobats					1st (Won Public Vote)
2	De Originale Kopier	Singers					(Won Judges' Vote)
3	Tea & Malene	Dancers					Eliminated
4	Sjov Business	Gym Workout Act					Eliminated
5	Sonne Sisters	Singers					2nd (Won Public Vote)
6	Oliver Florjull	Dancer					Eliminated
7	Shaker Brothers	Drum Tapping Act					(Lost Judges' Vote)

== Semi Finals 3 ==
Order	Artist	Act	Buzzes				Finished
Order	Artist	Act	Jarl	Cecilie	Peter	Nabiha	Finished
1	Mathias	Rubik's Cube solver					1st (Won Public Vote)
2	Tinus	Dancer					Eliminated
3	Sunday	Dancer					Eliminated
4	Dhol United	Band And Dance Group					Eliminated
5	Yin & Yang	Dancers					3rd (Judges' Vote tied – Won on Public Vote)
6	Gogge	Singer					2nd (Won Public Vote)
7	Trialaction Team	Cyclist Skills Group					4th (Judges' Vote tied – Lost on Public Vote)

== Semi Finals 4 ==
Order	Artist	Act	Buzzes				Finished
Order	Artist	Act	Jarl	Cecilie	Peter	Nabiha	Finished
1	Cobra	Rappers, Singers And Beat Boxers					Eliminated
2	Dynamic Duo	Dancers					2nd (Won Public Vote)
3	Gasbox	Band					1st (Won Public Vote)
4	Louise Wawrzynska	Pole Dancer					(Lost Judges' Vote)
5	Christina Nouel	Singer And Guitarist					Eliminated
6	EIF Gymstars	Dance Group					(Won Judges' Vote)
7	Nanna	Harpist					Eliminated

== Final 12 Part 1 ==
Order	Artist	Act	Buzzes				Finished
Order	Artist	Act	Jarl	Cecilie	Peter	Nabiha	Finished
1	William	Pianist					1st (Won Public Vote)
2	Motus	Acrobats					2nd (Won Public Vote)
3	Sonne Sisters	Singers					(Lost Judges' Vote)
4	Kompaoni Stor	Dance Group					(Won Judges' Vote)
5	Marcos Bessa	Singer					Eliminated
6	De Originale Kopier	Singers					Eliminated

== Final 12 Part 2 ==
Order	Artist	Act	Buzzes				Finished
Order	Artist	Act	Jarl	Cecilie	Peter	Nabiha	Finished
1	Dynamic Duo	Dancers					1st (Won Public Vote)
2	Yin & Yang	Dancers					4th (Judges' Vote tied – Lost on Public Vote)
3	Matias	Rubik's Cube solver					2nd (Won Public Vote)
4	Gasbox	Band					Eliminated
5	EIF Gymstars	Dance Group					Eliminated
6	Gogge	Singer					3rd (Judges' Vote tied – Won on Public Vote)

== Final ==
Order	Artist	Act	Buzzes				Finished
Order	Artist	Act	Jarl	Cecilie	Peter	Nabiha	Finished
1	Kompaoni Stor	Dance Group					6th
2	William	Pianist					3rd
3	Matias	Rubik's Cube solver					1st
4	Motus	Acrobats					4th
5	Dynamic Duo	Dancers					2nd
6	Gogge	Singer					5th

=== Semi-finalists ===
Winner
Runner-up
Finalist
Final 12

Name of act	Act	Semi-final	Result
Mathias	Rubik's Cube solver	3	Winner
Dynamic Duo	Dancers	4	Runner-up
William	Pianist	1	3rd place
Motus	Acrobats	2	4th place
Gogge	Singer	3	5th place
Kompaoni Stor	Dance Group	1	6th place
Marcos Bessa	Singer	1	Final 12
De Originale Kopier	Singers	2	Final 12
Sonne Sisters	Singers	2	Final 12
Yin & Yang	Dancers	3	Final 12
Gasbox	Band	4	Final 12
EIF Gymstars	Dance Group	4	Final 12
Rainy Day	Band	1	Eliminated
Mads & Mathilde	Dance Duo	1	Eliminated
Jimmy Enoch	Unicyclist Balance Act	1	Eliminated
Mads And Andre	Magician	1	Eliminated
Tea & Malene	Dancers	2	Eliminated
Sjov Business	Gym Workout Act	2	Eliminated
Oliver Florjull	Dancer	2	Eliminated
Shaker Brothers	Drum Tapping Act	2	Eliminated
Tinus	Dancer	3	Eliminated
Sunday	Dancer	3	Eliminated
Dhol United	Band And Dance Group	3	Eliminated
Trialaction Team	Cyclist Skill Act	3	Eliminated
Cobra	Rappers, Singers And Beat Box	4	Eliminated
Louise Wawrzynska	Pole Dancer	4	Eliminated
Christina Nouel	Singer And Guitarist	4	Eliminated
Nanna	Harpist	4	Eliminated
