= Mind the gap (disambiguation) =

Mind the gap is a common safety announcement on the London Underground railway system and other train and subway systems, warning of the visual gap between the train doorway and the station platform.

Mind the gap may also refer to:

== Films ==
- Mind the Gap (2004 film), a 2004 film written & directed by Eric Schaeffer
- Mind the Gap (2007 film), a 2007 Swedish film
- Minding the Gap, a 2018 American documentary film directed by Bing Liu

== Literature ==
- Mind the Gap (novel), a 2008 fantasy novel written by Christopher Golden and Tim Lebbon
- Mind the Gap, a book by Michael Rosen

== Music ==
- Mind the Gap (Tristan Psionic album), 2000
- Mind the Gap (Scooter album), 2004
- Mind the Gap (Maria Pia De Vito album), 2009
- Mind the Gap (Nabiha album), 2013
- Mind The Gap, a 1995 album by the Irish band Kíla
- "Mind the Gap" (song), a 2012 song by Danish singer Nabiha
- "Mind The Gap", a 1987 song by The Justified Ancients of Mu Mu from the album 1987 (What the Fuck Is Going On?)
- "Mind The Gap", a 2007 song by Noisettes from the album What's the Time Mr Wolf?

== Other uses in arts, entertainment, and media ==
- Mind the Gap, a British television game show hosted by Paul Ross
- Mind the Gap, a comic published by Image Comics
- Bridget Christie Minds the Gap, a BBC Radio 4 comedy programme
- Mind the Gap Films, an independent TV production company based in Ireland
- Mind the Gap Theatre, a theatre company in New York and London
- Mind the Gap Theatre company, England's largest disability theatre company, based in Bradford, West Yorkshire
- "Mind the Gap", an episode of SpongeBob SquarePants

== See also ==
- Gap (disambiguation)
