= Danmark Har Talent season 3 =

Danmark Har Talent
- Season 3
- Hosted by: Christopher Læssø and Felix Schmidt
- Judges: Jarl Friis-Mikkelsen; Cecilie Lassen; Peter Frödin; Nabiha
- Winner: Johanne Astrid
- Runner-up: Mads Fencker

Release
- Original network: TV2
- Original release: 7 January – 8 April 2017

Season chronology
- ← Previous; Season 2 Next → Season 4

The third season of Danmark har talent aired on TV2 on 7 January 2017 and finished on 8 April 2017. The series will be again host by Christopher Læssø and Felix Schmidt. On the judging panel Jarl Friis-Mikkelsen, Cecilie Lassen, Nabiha and Peter Frödin will return while. Once again in this season the golden buzzer is available for each judge—and for the hosts for the first time—to press once the whole season to put one act straight through to the live shows. The competition was won by Drummer Johanne Astrid while Mind Reader Mads Fencker came Second and Acrobats Rasta Mizizi Acrobats came third.

== Semi-finals ==
The semi finals began on 4 March 2017. 7 acts will perform every week. 1 act will advanced from the public vote 1 act will advanced from the judges vote

=== Semi-final summary ===
| Key | Judges vote | Buzzed out | Golden buzzer | Won the public vote | Won the judges vote | Lost the judges vote |

=== Semi Finals 1 ===
| Order | Artist | Act | Buzzes | | | | Finished |
| Order | Artist | Act | Jarl | Nabiha | Cecilie | Peter | Finished |
|---|---|---|---|---|---|---|---|
| 1 | Team Happy Feet | Lindyhop Dancers | | | | | Eliminated |
| 2 | Rosa & Sofia | Gymnasts | | | | | Lost Judges' Vote |
| 3 | Aarhus Kemishow | Chemistry Show | | | | | Eliminated |
| 4 | Nabanita | Singer | | | | | Eliminated |
| 5 | Michiel | Circusact | | | | | Eliminated |
| 6 | Elias | Rapper | | | | | Won Judges' Vote |
| 7 | High 5 | Dance Group | | | | | Won Public Vote |

=== Semi Finals 2 ===
| Order | Artist | Act | Buzzes | | | | Result |
| Order | Artist | Act | Jarl | Nabiha | Cecilie | Peter | Result |
|---|---|---|---|---|---|---|---|
| 1 | Equals | Hip-Hop Dance Duo | | | | | Lost Judges' Vote |
| 2 | Mads Fencker | Mind Reader | | | | | Won Public Vote |
| 3 | Tuxedo Swing Band | Band | | | | | Eliminated |
| 4 | Rica & Tudi | Entertainers | | | | | Won Judges' Vote |
| 5 | Claudia Cederholm Winther | Singer | | | | | Eliminated |
| 6 | Eva & Michaela | Belly Dance Fusion Duo | | | | | Eliminated |
| 7 | Larzen | Rapper | | | | | Eliminated |

=== Semi Finals 3 ===
| Order | Artist | Act | Buzzes | | | | Result |
| Order | Artist | Act | Jarl | Nabiha | Cecilie | Peter | Result |
|---|---|---|---|---|---|---|---|
| 1 | True Tricks | Tricking Group | | | | | 2nd (Judges' Vote tied – Won on Public Vote) |
| 2 | Jackie Pajo | Singer | | | | | Eliminated |
| 3 | Rookie | Hula Hoop Rings Artist | | | | | 1st (Won Public Vote) |
| 4 | Voices in Modern | Choir | | | | | Eliminated |
| 5 | Valdemar | Pianist | | | | | 3rd (Judges' Vote tied – Lost on Public Vote) |
| 6 | Nick | Dancer | | | | | Eliminated |
| 7 | Swagger | Rap Group | | | | | Eliminated |

=== Semi Finals 4 ===
| Order | Artist | Act | Buzzes | | | | Result |
| Order | Artist | Act | Jarl | Nabiha | Cecilie | Peter | Result |
|---|---|---|---|---|---|---|---|
| 1 | Hot Shot | Dance Group | | | | | Eliminated |
| 2 | Tobias TKB | Singer | | | | | Eliminated |
| 3 | Simon Arnø | Magician | | | | | Lost Judges' Vote |
| 4 | Grete | Revy Singer | | | | | Eliminated |
| 5 | Rasta Mizizi Acrobats | Acrobats | | | | | Won Public Vote |
| 6 | MY | Dance Duo | | | | | Won Judges' Vote |
| 7 | Sara Krone | Musical Singer | | | | | Eliminated |

=== Semi Finals 5 ===
| Order | Artist | Act | Buzzes | | | | Result |
| Order | Artist | Act | Jarl | Nabiha | Cecilie | Peter | Result |
|---|---|---|---|---|---|---|---|
| 1 | Johanne Astrid | Drummer | | | | | Won Public Vote |
| 2 | Villain State of Mind | Dance Trio | | | ^{2} | | Won Judges' Vote |
| 3 | Novanoid | Light Artists | | | | | Eliminated |
| 4 | HotBeautyStuff | Dance Duo | | | | | Lost Judges' Vote |
| 5 | Ditte Bissenbacker | Singer | | | | | Eliminated |
| 6 | Bimserne | Choir | | | | | Eliminated |
| 7 | Foxy Ladies | Can-Can Dancers | | | | | Eliminated |

- ^2 Due to the majority vote for Villain State of Mind, Cecilie's voting intention was not revealed.

== Final ==
=== Final summary ===
| Key | Buzzed out | Winner | Runner-up | 3rd Place | 4th Place | 5th Place |

| Order | Artist | Act | Buzzes | | | | Finished |
| Order | Artist | Act | Jarl | Nabiha | Cecilie | Peter | Finished |
|---|---|---|---|---|---|---|---|
| 1 | Rasta Mizizi Acrobats | Acrobats | | | | | 3rd |
| 2 | Elias | Rapper | | | | | Bottom 5 |
| 3 | Villain State of Mind | Dance Trio | | | | | 4th |
| 4 | Rica og Tudi | Entertainers | | | | | Bottom 5 |
| 5 | Rookie | Hula Hoop Rings Artist | | | | | 5th |
| 6 | High 5 | Dance Group | | | | | Bottom 5 |
| 7 | Johanne Astrid | Drummer | | | | | 1st |
| 8 | MY | Dance Duo | | | | | Bottom 5 |
| 9 | Mads Fencker | Mind Reader | | | | | 2nd |
| 10 | True Tricks | Tricking Group | | | | | Bottom 5 |
