= Gaps (disambiguation) =

Gaps is a solitaire card game.

Gaps or GAPs may also refer to:

- Gaps (album), an album by Monster Bobby
- GAPs or GTPase activating protein, a protein molecule
- GAPS or General Antiparticle Spectrometer, a dark matter detection experiment

== See also ==
- Gap (disambiguation)
- Gaps and gores, real estate missed out when defining boundaries
- Gaps of the Allegheny, a series of escarpment-eroding water gaps in the Allegheny range
- GAPPS (disambiguation)
