= Danmark Har Talent season 4 =

Danmark Har Talent
- Season 4
- Hosted by: Christopher Læssø and Felix Schmidt
- Judges: Jarl Friis-Mikkelsen; Cecilie Lassen; Peter Frödin; Thomas Buttenschøn
- Winner: Moonlight Brothers
- Runner-up: Anastasia Skukhtorova

Release
- Original network: TV2
- Original release: 20 January – 14 April 2018

Season chronology
- ← Previous; Season 3 Next → Season 5

The fourth season of Danmark har talent aired on TV2 on 20 January 2018 and finished on 14 April 2018. The series will be again host by Christopher Læssø and Felix Schmidt. On the judging panel Jarl Friis-Mikkelsen, Cecilie Lassen, and Peter Frödin will return while new forth judge Thomas Buttenschøn while Nabiha won't return for her third season. once again in this season the golden buzzer is available for each judge to press and the hosts once the whole season to put one act straight through to the live shows. Moonlight Brotheres Won the competition against Anastasia Skukhtorova Who came second and Dance Group Champions League Family came third.

== Semi-finals ==
The semi finals began on 10 March 2018. 7 acts will perform every week. 1 act will advanced from the public vote 1 act will advanced from the judges vote

=== Semi-final summary ===
Key	Judges vote	Buzzed out	Golden buzzer	Wildcard	Won the public vote	Won the judges vote	Lost the judges vote

=== Semi Finals 1 ===
Order	Artist	Act	Buzzes				Result
Order	Artist	Act	Jarl	Cecilie	Peter	Thomas	Result
1	HabenGoods	Band					Lost Judges' Vote
2	Emil Stenlund	Dancer					Won Public Vote
3	Cirkus Mascot	Circusact					Eliminated
4	Laura Lehaff	Singer					Eliminated
5	Skumfiduza	Dance Group					Eliminated
6	Eve	Choir					Won Judges' Vote
7	Daniel Thomsen	Magician					Eliminated

=== Semi Finals 2 ===
Order	Artist	Act	Buzzes				Result
Order	Artist	Act	Jarl	Cecilie	Peter	Thomas	Result
1	Spahi Dance Studio	Dance Group					Lost Judges' Vote
2	Mad Skills	Ball Tricks					Eliminated
3	DHG Acro Talent	Acrobats					Won Public Vote
4	Cecilia Gosilla	Sword Swallower					Eliminated
5	Noa	Instrument Player				^{1}	Won Judges' Vote
6	Beg To Differ	Dance Duo					Eliminated
7	Sheima	Singer					Eliminated

- ^1 Due to the majority vote for Noa, Thomas’s vote was not required but he would have voted for Spahi Dance Studio.

=== Semi Finals 3 ===
Order	Artist	Act	Buzzes				Result
Order	Artist	Act	Jarl	Cecilie	Peter	Thomas	Result
1	Ildrengene	Fire Dance Duo					Won Public Vote
2	Team Vici	Swing Trio					Lost Judges' Vote
3	Hasnui	Guitarist					Eliminated
4	Harley Queen	Drag Act					Eliminated
5	Mini Swaggers	Dance Group					Eliminated
6	Wickmann	Saxophone Player					Eliminated
7	Familia Loca	Dance Duo					Won Judges' Vote

=== Semi Finals 4 ===
Order	Artist	Act	Buzzes				Result
Order	Artist	Act	Jarl	Cecilie	Peter	Thomas	Result
1	DJ Credit	DJ					Eliminated
2	Emilija	Dancer					Won Judges' Vote
3	Daniel Rosenfeldt	Guitarist					Lost Judges' Vote
4	Champions League Family	Dance Group					Won Public Vote
5	John & Charlie	Ventriloquist					Eliminated
6	Benjamin Barfod	Instrument Player					Eliminated
7	Rikke Flaer	Singer					Eliminated

=== Semi Finals 5 ===
Order	Artist	Act	Buzzes				Result
Order	Artist	Act	Jarl	Cecilie	Peter	Thomas	Result
1	Carla & Carl Vilhelm	Modern Dance Duo					3rd (Judges' Vote tied – Lost on Public Vote)
2	SONO	Capella Choir					Eliminated
3	Krom Kendama	Kendama Tricks					Eliminated
4	Caroline Manon	Singer					Eliminated
5	Moonlight Brothers	Brothers Dance Duo					2nd (Judges' Vote tied – Won on Public Vote)
6	Yukka	Singer					Eliminated
7	Anastasia Skukhtorova	Pole Dancer					1st (Won Public Vote)

== Final ==
=== Final summary ===
Key	Buzzed out	Winner	Runner-up	3rd Place	4th Place	5th Place

Order	Artist	Act	Buzzes				Finished
Order	Artist	Act	Jarl	Cecilie	Peter	Thomas	Finished
1	Champions League Family	Dance Group					3rd
2	Noa	Instrument Player					5th
3	Emil Stenlund	Dancer					4th
4	Eve	Choir					Bottom 5
5	Emilija	Dancer					Bottom 5
6	DHG Acro Talent	Acrobats					Bottom 5
7	Moonlight Brothers	Brothers Dance Duo					1st
8	Ildrengene	Fire Dance Duo					Bottom 5
9	Familia Loca	Dance Duo					Bottom 5
10	Anastasia Skukhtorova	Pole Dancer					2nd
