= Danmark Har Talent season 5 =

Danmark Har Talent
- Season 5
- Hosted by: Rasmus Brohave and Cecilie Haugaard
- Judges: Signe Lindkvist; Simon Jul; Sus Wilkins; Peter Frödin
- Winner: Alex Porsing
- Runner-up: Sunny Cagara

Release
- Original network: TV2
- Original release: 24 August – 23 November 2019

Season chronology
- ← Previous; Season 4

The fifth and final season of Danmark Har Talent began airing on TV2 on 24 August 2019 and was hosted by Rasmus Brohave and Cecilie Haugaard. The judges were Signe Lindkvist, Simon Jul, Sus Wilkins and Peter Frödin. Alex Porsing won the competition against Magician Sunny Cagara who came 2nd and Joker & Harley Quinn came 3rd. This was the last season of the show, as TV2 has axed the programme.

== Semi-finals ==
The semi finals began on 28 September 2019. Seven acts perform every week, with one act advancing from the public vote and one act advancing from the judges' vote.

=== Semi-final summary ===
Key	Judges' vote	Buzzed out	Golden buzzer	Won the public vote	Won the judges' vote	Lost the judges' vote

=== Semi Finals 1 ===
Order	Artist	Act	Buzzes				Finished
Order	Artist	Act	Signe	Simon	Sus	Peter	Finished
1	Global Kidz	Dance Group					Eliminated
2	Jes Busk	Comedian					Lost Judges' Vote
3	Malthe & Ibrahim	Dance Duo					Won Public Vote
4	August Finkas	Clarinet Player					Eliminated
5	Anne-Katrine	Acrobat					Eliminated
6	Mia Olesen	Singer					Eliminated
7	Miss Privileze	Drag Act				^{1}	Won Judges' Vote

- ^1 Due to the majority vote for Miss Privileze, Peter's voting intention was not revealed.

=== Semi Finals 2 ===
Order	Artist	Act	Buzzes				Finished
Order	Artist	Act	Signe	Simon	Sus	Peter	Finished
1	Villads & Valdemar	Violin Player Duo					3rd (Judges' Vote tied – Lost on Public Vote)
2	Johnny	Acrobat					1st (Won Public Vote)
3	Morten Deurell	Magician					Eliminated
4	Kompagni 8	Dance Group					Eliminated
5	Kerem Seker	Singer					Eliminated
6	Ray & Ellen	Dance Duo					Eliminated
7	Alex Porsing	Motocross					2nd (Judges' Vote tied – Won on Public Vote)

=== Semi Finals 3 ===
Order	Artist	Act	Buzzes				Finished
Order	Artist	Act	Signe	Simon	Sus	Peter	Finished
1	Lill’ Saints	Dance Group					Lost Judges' Vote
2	Hjernehviskerne	Hypnotists					Eliminated
3	Olivia Frederikke	Singer					Eliminated
4	Oscar Roth Andersen	Rubik's Cube Solver		^{2}			Won Judges' Vote
5	Daniel Rasmussen	Saxophone Player					Eliminated
6	Joker & Harley Quinn	Dance Duo					Won Public Vote
7	MC Lillebror & Den Lette Gade	Rappers					Eliminated

- ^2 Due to the majority vote for Oscar Roth Andersen, Simon's voting intention was not revealed.

=== Semi Finals 4 ===
Order	Artist	Act	Buzzes				Finished
Order	Artist	Act	Signe	Simon	Sus	Peter	Finished
1	Eva Sandersen	Taekwondo				^{3}	Won Judges' Vote
2	Nuke_N_Sive	Dance Duo					Lost Judges' Vote
3	Alice Rose	Autoharp Player and Singer					Eliminated
4	The Playmakers	Dance Trio					Eliminated
5	Sedjanka	Choir					Eliminated
6	Dystopia	Horror Themed Show					Won Public Vote
7	Loud Noises	Band					Eliminated

- ^3 Due to the majority vote for Eva Sandersen, Peter's voting intention was not revealed.

=== Semi Finals 5 ===
Order	Artist	Act	Buzzes				Finished
Order	Artist	Act	Signe	Simon	Sus	Peter	Finished
1	Da Freakáliz	Dance Group					3rd (Judges' Vote tied – Lost on Public Vote)
2	Mille and The Flyfokkers	Band					Eliminated
3	Rasmus	Swing Act					Eliminated
4	Søren Enghoff	Singer					Eliminated
5	Janni	Dancer					Eliminated
6	Elisabeth Guang	Pianist					1st (Won Public Vote)
7	Sunny Cagara	Magician					2nd (Judges' Vote tied – Won on Public Vote)

== Final ==
Key	Buzzed out	Winner	Runner-up	3rd Place	4th Place	5th Place

Order	Artist	Act	Buzzes				Finished
Order	Artist	Act	Signe	Simon	Sus	Peter	Finished
1	Johnny	Acrobat					4th
2	Malthe & Ibrahim	Dance Duo					Bottom 5
3	Elisabeth Guang	Pianist					Bottom 5
4	Miss Privileze	Drag Act					Bottom 5
5	Oscar Roth Andersen	Rubik's Cube Solver					Bottom 5
6	Joker & Harley Quinn	Dance Duo					3rd
7	Eva Sandersen	Taekwondo					Bottom 5
8	Sunny Cagara	Magician					2nd
9	Alex Porsing	Motocross					1st
10	Dystopia	Horror Themed Show					5th
