= Gapper =

Gapper may refer to:

- John Gapper (born 1959), British editor and journalist
- John Gapper (MP)
- Gapper (mascot), a Major League Baseball mascot for the Cincinnati Reds
- Agkistrodon piscivorus, a.k.a. the cottonmouth, a venomous pit viper found in North America

== See also ==
- Gap (disambiguation)
