= Johanne Astrid Poulsen =

Danish drummer (born 2006)

- Born: Johanne Astrid Poulsen; 2006 (age 19–20); Viborg, Denmark
- Genre: Rock
- Occupation: Musician
- Instrument: Drums
- Years active: 2016-present

Johanne Astrid Poulsen (born in 2006) is a Danish drummer, best known as a winner of Denmark's Got Talent TV show. Since her final performance, she became popular on social media sites and has received recognition from both Danish and foreign stars for her abilities.

== Biography ==
Johanne Astrid was born in Viborg, Denmark. At early age, parents got her a toy drum set which was replaced with Drum Limousine drum kit when she became 7 years old. In 2016 she played with a real band for the first time, followed by first live performance for the audience. Since then she has played on festivals and participated in promo-videos.

== Denmark Har Talent ==
In 2017, Johanne Astrid won the 3rd season of Denmark's Got Talent show and a prize of 250,000 krone ($39,250 / €33,550). During the course of competition, she performed among others Rage Against the Machine's Killing In The Name, Led Zeppelin's Whole Lotta Love, as well as songs from Dizzy Mizz Lizzy, D-A-D and Kashmir.
