= GAPPS =

GAPPS may refer to:

- Google Apps, now Google Workspace
- Google Mobile Services

== See also ==
- Gaps (disambiguation)
