= Kidd (Danish rapper) =

Danish rapper

Nicholas Westwood Kidd better known by his stage name Kidd (sometimes stylized as KIDD) (b. 31 March 1989) is a Danish rapper and hip hop artist, with Indian and Scottish origin. After gaining attention online, he founded CHEFF Records. He was nominated for "Best Newcomer" in 2011 and performed during 2011 Danish Music Awards.

== Discography ==
=== Albums ===
Year	Album	Credited as	Peak chart positions	Certifications
Year	Album	Credited as	DEN	Certifications
2011	Greatest Hits 2011	KIDD	5	
2014	Kiddæssancen	Kidd	6	
2024	Og så... videre	Kidd	29	

=== EPs ===
- 2011: Mine venner snakker (EP)

=== Singles ===
Year	Single	Credited as	Peak chart positions	Album
Year	Single	Credited as	DEN	Album
2011	"Ik lavet penge"	KIDD	13	
2011	"Uhh det er så svært at være"	KIDD	30	
2012	"Nordhavn"	KIDD	35	
2012	"Fetterlein"	KIDD	15	
2014	"Brunt øje"	Kidd	25	
2014	"Ryst pagne"	Kidd	24	
2021	"Buongiorno"	Kidd	2	

Featured in

Year	Single	Peak chart positions	Album
Year	Single	DEN	Album
2011	"Strip, Pt. 1" (Medina featuring Kidd)	6	
2021	"Sender mig til månen" (Cheff Records featuring Kidd, TopGunn and Klumb)	34	
2021	"Senere" (Cheff Records featuring Kidd, TopGunn and Klumb)	34	
2021	"En tår til" (Lolo featuring Larry 44 and Kidd)	38	

== Videography ==
- 2011: "Kysset med Jamel"
- 2011: "Ik lavet penge"
