= Nautical time =

System that allows ships on sea to express their local time

Nautical time is a maritime time standard established in the 1920s to allow ships on the high seas to coordinate their local time with other ships, consistent with a long nautical tradition of accurate celestial navigation. Nautical time divides the globe into 24 nautical time zones with hourly clock offsets, spaced at 15 degrees by longitudinal coordinate, with no political deviation.

Nautical timekeeping dates back to the early 20th century as a standard way to keep time at sea, although it largely only applied to military fleets pre–World War 2. This time-keeping method is only used for radio communications and to account for slight inaccuracies that using Greenwich Mean Time (GMT) may lead to during navigation of the high seas. It is typically only used for trans-oceanic travel, as captains will often not change the timekeeping for short distances such as channels or inland seas.

== History of nautical time ==
=== Establishment ===
Prior to 1920, ships kept solar time on the high seas by setting their clocks at night or at the morning sight so that, given the ship's speed and direction, it would be 12 o'clock when the sun crossed the ship's meridian.

The establishment of nautical standard times, nautical standard time zones and the nautical date line were recommended by the Anglo-French Conference on Time-keeping at Sea in 1917. The conference recommended that the standard apply to all ships, both military and civilian. These zones were adopted by all major fleets between 1920 and 1925 but not by many independent merchant ships until World War II.

=== Letter suffixes ===
Around 1950, a letter suffix was added to the zone description, assigning Z to the zero zone, and A–M (except J) to the east and N–Y to the west (J may be assigned to local time in non-nautical applications – zones M and Y have the same clock time but differ by 24 hours: a full day). These can be vocalized using the NATO phonetic alphabet which pronounces the letter Z as Zulu, leading to the use of the term "Zulu Time" for Greenwich Mean Time, or UT1 from January 1, 1972 onward.

Zone Z runs from 7°30′W to 7°30′E longitude, while zone A runs from 7°30′E to 22°30′E longitude, etc.

These nautical letters have been added to some time zone maps, like the World Time Zone Map published by HM Nautical Almanac Office (NAO), which extended the letters by adding an asterisk (*), a dagger (†) or a dot (•) for areas that do not use a nautical time zone (areas that have a half-hour or quarter-hour offset, and areas that have an offset greater than 12 hours), and a section sign (§) for areas that do not have a legal standard time (parts of Antarctica).

=== Today ===
In practice, nautical times are used only for radio communication, etc. Aboard the ship, e.g. for scheduling work and meal times, the ship may use a suitable time of its own choosing. The captain is permitted to change his or her clocks at a chosen time following the ship's entry into another time zone, typically at midnight. Ships on long-distance passages change time zone on board in this fashion. On short passages the captain may not adjust clocks at all, even if they pass through different time zones, for example between the UK and continental Europe. Passenger ships often use both nautical and on-board time zones on signs. When referring to time tables and when communicating with land, the land time zone must be employed.

== Application ==
The nautical time zone system is analogous to the terrestrial time zone system for use on high seas. Under the system time changes are required for changes of longitude in one-hour steps. The one-hour step corresponds to a time zone width of 15° longitude. The 15° gore that is offset from GMT by twelve hours is bisected by the nautical date line into two 7°30′ gores that differ from GMT by ±12 hours. A nautical date line is implied but not explicitly drawn on time zone maps. It follows the 180th meridian except where it is interrupted by territorial waters adjacent to land, forming gaps: it is a pole-to-pole dashed line.

Time on a ship's clocks and in a ship's log had to be stated along with a "zone description", which was the number of hours to be added to zone time to obtain GMT, hence zero in the Greenwich time zone, with negative numbers from −1 to −12 for time zones to the east and positive numbers from +1 to +12 to the west (hours, minutes, and seconds for nations without an hourly offset).

== Nautical day ==
Up to late 1805 the Royal Navy used three days: nautical, civil (or "natural"), and astronomical. For example, a nautical day of 10 July would commence at noon on 9 July civil reckoning and end noon on 10 July civil reckoning, with pm coming before am. The astronomical day of 10 July would commence at noon of 10 July civil reckoning and ended at noon on 11 July. The astronomical day was brought into use following the introduction of The Nautical Almanac in 1767, and the British Admiralty issued an order ending the use of the nautical day on 11 October 1805. The US did not follow suit until 1848, while many foreign vessels carried on using it until the 1880s.
