= Cracks (Nabiha album) =

2010 music album by Nabiha

Studio album by Nabiha
- Released: 29 January 2010
- Genre: Pop
- Length: 43:57
- Label: Border Breakers

Nabiha chronology
Cracks (2010)	More Cracks (2011)

Singles from Cracks
- 1. "Deep Sleep" Released: 18 January 2010; 2. "The Enemy" Released: 2010

Professional ratings
Review scores
Source	Rating
Gaffa	5/6 stars
Ekstra Bladet	3/6 stars
Tonspion	5/6 stars

Cracks is the debut album by Danish singer, songwriter and actress Nabiha. The album is in English.

== Track listing ==
No.	Title	Writer(s)	Producer(s)	Length
1.	"Red Letter Days"	Carl Ryden, Nabiha Bensouda	Carl Ryden	2:45
2.	"Deep Sleep"	Ryden, Chanelle Gstettenbauer, Nabiha Bensouda	Ryden	3:02
3.	"The Enemy"	Ryden, Cozi Costi, Bensouda	Ryden	3:08
4.	"You"	Ryden, Costi, Bensouda	Ryden	3:09
5.	"Cracks in the Concrete"	Ryden, Bensouda, Nina Woodford	Ryden	3:14
6.	"My Friend"	Ryden, Bensouda	Ryden	3:46
7.	"Computer Love"	Ryden, Gstettenbauer, Bensouda	Ryden	3:08
8.	"Boomerang"	Ryden, Bensouda, Woodford	Ryden, Galgani	2:58
9.	"If I Cared"	Ryden, Bensouda, Woodford	Ryden	3:00
10.	"Midnight Blues"	Ryden, Bensouda	Ryden	3:29
11.	"Sneaking Out the Backdoor"	Ryden, Bensouda, Woodford	Ryden	3:20
12.	"Open Doors"	Carl Ryden, Nabiha Bensouda	Ryden	3:52
13.	"The Tale of the Children and the Golden Tree"	Ryden, Costi, Bensouda	Ryden	2:37
14.	""2-3-4""	Bensouda	Ryden	4:56

=== More Cracks ===
More Cracks

Studio album by Nabiha
- Released: 20 September 2011
- Genre: Pop
- Label: disco:wax / Sony Music

Nabiha chronology
Cracks (2010)	More Cracks (2011)	Mind the Gap (2013)

Singles from More Cracks
- 1. "Trouble" Released: 2011; 2. "Never Played the Bass (song)" Released: 2011

On September 20, 2011, Nabiha released More Cracks as her debut album internationally. This version includes eight songs from Cracks with four new tracks.

No.	Title	Writer(s)	Producer(s)	Length
1.	"Sound of My Gun"	Carl Ryden, Cozi Costi, Nabiha Bensouda, Steven Tyler, Tom Hamilton	Carl Ryden	3:20
2.	"Trouble"	Ryden, Bensouda, Tommy Danvers	Ryden, Tommy Danvers	3:14
3.	"Deep Sleep"	Ryden, Chanelle Gstettenbauer, Bensouda	Ryden	3:02
4.	"The Enemy"	Ryden, Costi, Bensouda	Ryden	3:08
5.	"Sneaking Out the Backdoor"	Ryden, Bensouda, Nina Woodford	Ryden	3:20
6.	"Never Played the Bass"	Michelle Escoffery, Bensouda, Will Simms, Zeriiya Zekkariyas	Will Simms	3:09
7.	"Cracks in the Concrete"	Ryden, Bensouda, Woodford	Ryden	3:14
8.	"You"	Ryden, Costi, Bensouda	Ryden	3:09
9.	"Can't Do Anything"	Escoffery, Bensouda, Simms	Simms	3:15
10.	"Computer Love"	Ryden, Gstettenbauer, Bensouda	Ryden	3:08
11.	"Boomerang"	Ryden, Bensouda, Woodford	Ryden, Galgani	2:58
12.	"Midnight Blues"	Ryden, Bensouda	Ryden	3:29
Total length:				38:18

== Release history ==
Cracks

Region	Date	Label	Format(s)
Denmark	29 January 2010	Border Breakers	CD, digital download

More Cracks

Region	Date	Label	Format(s)
United States	20 September 2011	Disco:Wax	CD, digital download
Germany	24 August 2012	Universal	CD, digital download
