= Gaps and gores =

Gaps and gores are portions of land areas that do not conform to boundaries found in cadastre and other land surveys based upon imprecise measurements and other ambiguities of metes and bounds. A gap, also known as a hiatus, occurs where the descriptions in deeds describing adjacent properties (unintentionally) overlook a space or "gap" between them. A gore occurs where descriptions in larger administrative boundaries (towns, counties) of adjacent jurisdictions or, large parcels, all fail to include some portion of land between them, forming an unclaimed, characteristically triangular "sliver" of land.

Disputes often arise regarding the ownership of gaps and gores when they are discovered, usually when developers detect sufficient value in the local land. Local laws will determine whether they are considered abandoned or rather adhere to (or may be absorbed by) one adjacent parcel or another. For example, in Tennessee law, tax map boundaries can become property boundaries (notwithstanding a survey and deed to the contrary) merely by paying the taxes on the land for twenty years in the belief that it was part of the ownership, even if it encompasses adjacent gaps and gores. See adverse possession.

== See also ==
- Gore (surveying)
- Gore (segment)
- Land survey
