= The Gap =

The Gap may refer to:

== Places ==
=== Antarctica ===
- The Gap (Antarctica), on Ross Island

=== Australia ===
- The Gap, New South Wales, a locality near Wagga Wagga, New South Wales
- The Gap, Northern Territory, a suburb of Alice Springs, Northern Territory
- The Gap, Queensland, a suburb of Brisbane, Queensland
- The Gap, South Australia, a locality near Naracoorte, South Australia
- The Gap (Sydney), an ocean cliff at Watsons Bay, Sydney, New South Wales
- The Gap is a feature in Torndirrup National Park in Western Australia

=== Canada ===
- Rural Municipality of The Gap No. 39, Saskatchewan

=== United States ===
- Fort Indiantown Gap, a US Army fort located in Lebanon County, Pennsylvania
- The Gap, Arizona, unincorporated community, Coconino County, Arizona

== Music, film, and television ==
- The Gap Band, an American music group
- The Gap (Joan of Arc album), a 2000 album by Joan of Arc
- The Gap (Bryn Haworth album), a 1980 studio album by Bryn Haworth
- The Gap (song), a 1982 song by The Thompson Twins
- The Gap (film) (El Boquete), a 2006 Argentine film
- Der Spalt (The Gap), a 2014 German film
- "The Gap" (Pluribus), the seventh episode of the television series Pluribus

== Other ==
- The Gap (book), discussing the cognitive difference between humans and other animals
- The Gap, Inc., chain of retail clothing stores
- The Gap (magazine), Austrian culture and music magazine
- The Gap FC, an Australian soccer team
- nickname for Volunteer Speedway in Greene County, Tennessee

== See also ==
- The Gap, in the science fiction novel series The Gap Cycle by Stephen Donaldson
- Gap (disambiguation)
- Gaap
