= Christopher Læssø =

Danish actor and TV presenter (born 1985)

Christopher Læssø (born 1985) is a Danish actor and TV presenter.

== Selected filmography ==
- A Man Comes Home (2007)
- The Square (2017)
- De Frivillige (released as Out of Tune)
- Ehrengard: The Art of Seduction (2023)

== Selected television ==
- Heartless (2014)
- Danmark Har Talent (2014–present)
