= Mind the Gap (song) =

Single by Nabiha

from the album Mind the Gap
- Released: 10 September 2012
- Recorded: Make Music Studio (London, England)
- Genre: Pop, funk
- Length: 2:46
- Label: disco:wax
- Songwriters: Carl Ryden, Michelle Escoffery, Nabiha Bensouda, Will Simms
- Producers: Carl Ryden, Will Simms

Nabiha singles chronology
"Never Played the Bass" (2011)	"Mind the Gap" (2012)	"Ask Yourself" (2013)

"Mind the Gap" is a song by Danish singer Nabiha, released as the lead single from her second studio album of the same name. She wrote it with Michelle Escoffery, Carl Ryden and Will Simms. The name was inspired from warning signs on the London Underground station, while it also refers to the gap between her front teeth, meaning good luck. The song has been a hit on various charts in UK. Denmark, the Netherlands, Belgium, Bulgaria, Poland and Hungary, and has also been positively received by music critics.

== Background and composition ==
"Mind the Gap" was written by Nabiha, Michelle Escoffery, Carl Ryden, and Will Simms, with both Ryden and Simms handling production of the song. The entire song was recorded, produced and mixed by Ryden at Make Music Studio in London, and was mastered at Metroplis in London. The track was released as the lead single of her second studio album of the same name, where it is the third track, on 10 September 2012.

"Mind the Gap" is a funky soul pop song that plays for a duration of 2 minutes and 46 seconds. Instrumentation includes lead vocals, backing vocals, keyboards, guitar, and programmed drums. The backing vocalist for the song was Terri Walker. The title and concept of the song came from seeing warnings at the London Underground station on numerous trips to the studio, which read "Mind the Gap". It also comes from the space between her front teeth, and her experience with other people looking at her. According to Nabiha, "It is a huge part of me, and in many African countries it symbolizes ‘good luck’. So the message is that we must take care of each other and ourselves, so everybody arrives safely to their destination."

== Critical reception ==
Gaffa wrote that "Mind the Gap", along with "Kill It With Love" and "Heartbreaker", were "excellent numbers which funnily enough is the most efficient on the album [Mind the Gap]." Scandipop considered the song her best one throughout her career, writing "Instantly catchy, it’s the sort of one-listen-and-you’re-hooked kind of thing that we subscribe to so heavily around these parts. “mind the gap, mind the girl, da-da-da-da-da-da-daaaa” (not the actual lyrics)." Ekstra Bladet opined that "'Mind the Gap' refers to Nabiha space between the front teeth, but the title would therefore seem more cheerful if she also had glorious characteristics musically."

== Music video ==
Singer Nibiha performs in the black-and-white video in front of a microphone.

The video for "Mind the Gap" premiered on 26 November 2012. It was directed by Scott Altman. The video is in black-and-white, with Nabiha performing in front of the microphone. According to Altman, "After pitching on the video, label and management approached me with a couple of ideas. In the end we stripped the ideas back and decided to shoot a performance based video in black and white. Once again Nabiha was great to work with – a natural performer, whose ability and talent got better with every take."

== Live performances ==
"Mind the Gap" has been performed by Nabiha at the 2012 Danish Music Awards, and on 18 April 2013 at the Store Vega. The song will be performed during the album's 2013 autumn tour.

== In other media ==
Finnish producer Lenno did a 70's disco remix of "Mind the Gap", which included instruments of horns, pianos, and strings.

"Mind the Gap" was played on the ninth episode of Pretty Little Liars' fourth season, titled "Into the Deep."

== Personnel ==
Adapted from liner notes of Mind the Gap:

- Nabiha — Lead vocals, songwriter
- Terri Walker — Backing vocals
- Carl Ryden — songwriter, producer, mixer, keyboardist, guitarist, drum programming
- Will Simms — songwriter, producer
- Michelle Escoffery — songwriter

== Charts ==
Chart (2012–2013)	Peak position
Belgium (Ultratop 50 Flanders)	37
Belgium (Ultratop 50 Dance Flanders)	27
Denmark (Tracklisten)	8
Denmark Airplay (Tracklisten)	1
Denmark Bit Track (Tracklisten)	1
Denmark Digital Songs (Billboard)	8
Denmark Streaming (Tracklisten)	1
Hungary (Mahasz Sales Top 40)	2
Hungary (Mahasz Dance Top 40)	28
Hungary (Mahasz Editors' Choice)	13
Hungary (Mahasz Radio Top 40)	2

== Certifications ==
Region	Certification
Denmark Downloads (International Federation of the Phonographic Industry)	Platinum
Denmark Streams (International Federation of the Phonographic Industry)	Platinum
