= Mind the Gap (Nabiha album) =

Studio album by Nabiha
- Released: 22 March 2014
- Genre: Pop
- Label: disco:wax, Sony Music

Nabiha chronology
More Cracks (2011)	Mind the Gap (2014)

Singles from Cracks
- 1. "Mind The Gap" Released: 2014; 2. "Ask Yourself" Released: 2014

Professional ratings
Review scores
Source	Rating
Gaffa	4/6 stars
Ekstra Bladet	3/6 stars

Mind the Gap is the second full studio album by Danish singer, songwriter, and actress Nabiha following her debut album Cracks and the reissued More Cracks with additional tracks.

== Track listing ==
No.	Title	Writer(s)	Length
1.	"Transition"	Nabiha Bensouda, Carl Rydén, Carla Marie Williams, Jonathan Coffer	3:34
2.	"Kill It with Love"	Bensouda, Raphaella Mazaheri-Asadi, William Henry, Bhavik Pattani	3:05
3.	"Mind the Gap"	Bensouda, Rydén, Michelle Escoffery, Will Simms	2:46
4.	"Fearless"	Bensouda, Rydén, Escoffery, Simms	3:34
5.	"State of Mind"	Bensouda, Cozi Costi, Mike Hamilton, Simms	3:23
6.	"Ask Yourself"	Bensouda, Rydén, Costi, Nina Woodford	3:28
7.	"Heartbreaker" (featuring Tabi Bonney)	Tabi Bonney, Bensouda, Terri Walker, Richard Adlam, Hal Ritson	3:48
8.	"All in Your Head"	Bensouda, Escoffery, Simms	3:17
9.	"Halo & Handcuffs" (featuring Outlandish)	Bensouda, Isam Bachiri, Lenny Martinez, Waqas Qadri, Lasse Kramhøft	3:47
10.	"Perfectly Human"	Bensouda, Rydén, Luciana Caporaso, Nick Clow	3:32
11.	"Mind the Gap" (Lenno remix (iTunes Store bonus))		3:19

== Release history ==
Region	Date	Label	Format(s)
Denmark	22 March 2013	disco:wax / Sony Music	CD, digital download

== Charts ==
Chart (2012)	Peak position
Danish Albums (Hitlisten)	10
Danish Bit Albums (Hitlisten)	1
