= Felix Smith =

American aviator

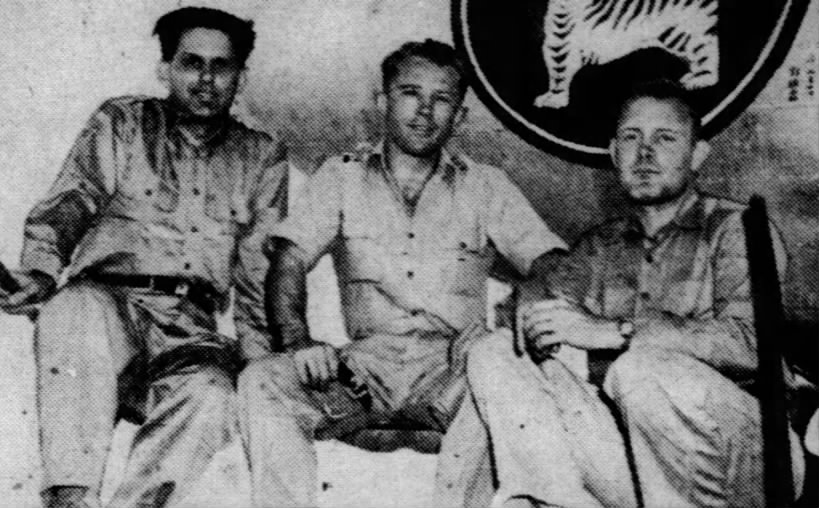
- Smith (right) with Ernest L. Zimmerman and Austin Young, 1947
- Born: March 19, 1918; Fort Smith, Arkansas, U.S.
- Died: October 3, 2018 (aged 100)
- Military career
- Conflicts: World War II
- Awards: Distinguished Flying Cross; Air Medal

Felix Smith (March 19, 1918 – October 3, 2018) was an American aviator.

== Life and career ==
Smith was born in Fort Smith, Arkansas. He was a CAT pilot.

Smith was director of operations for South Pacific Island Airways during the 1970s/1980s.

In 1993, Smith was awarded the Distinguished Flying Cross and the Air Medal.

In 1995 his flying memoir, China Pilot: Flying for Chiang and Chennault, was published by Brassey's.

Smith died on October 3, 2018, at the age of 100.
