= Anglo-French Conference on Time-keeping at Sea =

The Anglo-French Conference on Time-keeping at Sea was a conference held in London in June 1917.

== History ==
The Conference established the nautical date line and adopted an ideal form of the terrestrial time zone system for use at sea. It recommended that time changes required by changes of longitude be made in one-hour steps. This recommendation was adopted between 1920 and 1925 by all major fleets, including British, French and American. The rules applied to almost all naval ships and to many non-naval ships. Nevertheless, up to the Second World War, the old practice of keeping local apparent time prevailed on many independent merchant ships.

== Current usage ==
The nautical date line is implied but not explicitly drawn on time zone maps. It follows the 180° meridian except where it is interrupted by territorial waters adjacent to land, forming gaps: it is a pole-to-pole dashed line. Ships are required to adopt the standard time of a country when they are within its territorial waters, but must revert to international time zones (15° wide pole-to-pole gores) as soon as they leave territorial waters. The 15° gore that is offset from GMT or UT1 (not UTC) by twelve hours is bisected by the nautical date line into two 7.5° gores that differ from GMT by ±12 hours.

In reality nautical time zones are used only for radio communication etc. Internally on the ship, e.g. for work and meal hours, the ship may use a suitable time of its own choosing. This includes fixed installations such as oil rigs. For example, the Norwegian Ekofisk oil rigs are located in international water at longitude 3°E but use Norwegian time.

== See also ==
- Marine chronometer
