= Simon Jul =

Danish actor, comedian, singer and screenwriter (born 1977)

- Born: Simon Jul Jørgensen; July 1, 1977 (age 49); Seoul, South Korea
- Other names: Buddahglitter; Simon Luke-Poulsen
- Citizenship: Denmark
- Occupations: Actor; comedian; filmmaker; singer; screenwriter
- Years active: 1999–present

Simon Jul Jørgensen (born 1 July 1977) is a Danish actor, comedian, singer and screenwriter. He is best known for appearing in the controversial Danish documentary The Red Chapel.

== Early life ==
Born in Seoul, South Korea, Jørgensen was adopted by a Danish couple as an infant. He was raised in Grenaa and Roskilde.

== Career ==
He is best known for the satirical series Banjos Likørstue (2001) and Torsdag i 2'eren (2002), as well as the feature film Slim Slam Slum (2002) and his appearances in commercials for Sonofon and Toyota. He also appears in Mads Brügger documentary series Det røde kapel (The Red Chapel) from 2006. In 2007, he released the DVD Slik mig hvid (Lick Me White). Simon has also appeared in TV 2 Zulu comedy series Mørk og Jul (Dark and Jul), where he plays one of two news anchors alongside comedian Brian Mørk.

He is also an inactive musician in the rock band Den Franske Revolution, and has been a live musician on tour with Niarn and Suspekt.

Jørgensen has also done a lot of radio work. In 2007, he joined Morgenhyrderne as a morning radio host on Radio 100FM on January 9 and has since hosted the program Shangri-La on the same radio channel. On Radio24syv, he hosted the program Halløj i betalingsringen, and in 2016–17, he and Jan Elhøj hosted the satirical program Bæltestedet on the same channel.

He regularly hosts major events and appears on television. On April 4, 2010, he hosted the Danish DeeJay Awards 2010 at Valby-Hallen, and in the same year he was the master of ceremonies at Kapsejlads at Aarhus University together with Rasmus Bjerg, which they repeated in 2015.

In 2016, it was announced that Jørgensen had purchased a farm at a foreclosure auction together with Frank Erichsen, known from the program Bonderøven, where they offer courses in self-sufficiency and sustainability. The two met at the Folkemødet festival in 2014. He has worked in the kitchen at Jan Friis-Mikkelsen and since then as a kitchen assistant at many restaurants both in Denmark and abroad, but he is not a trained chef. He has used his enthusiasm for food in many food events and on TV, and he is co-owner of a butcher's shop.

He participated in the 2017 version of Strictly Come Dancing, where he danced with professional dancer Claudia Rex. The couple finished in eighth place.

In 2020, he created the cooking program Oraklet fra fondue.

Simon Jul is one of the participants in Stormester season 6, which he won.

In 2023, Francis Cardenau, Umut Sakarya, and Simon Jul created the food program Tre sultne mænd, in which they travel to their respective home countries and sample the local food culture.

== Filmography ==
=== Film ===
Year	Title	Role	Notes
2002	Slim Slam Slum	Slam	
2002	Nytår i 2'eren	Ulla Tordenskjold	
2006	Easy Skanking		
2008	Journey to Saturn	Fisse-Ole (voice)	
2009	The Red Chapel	Himself	
2010	The Olsen Gang Gets Polished	Allan (voice)	
2011	Jensen & Jensen	Politiassistent (voice)	
2012	Talenttyven	Tolk	Direct-to-video
2014	Kolbøttefabrikken	Ethan	

== See also ==
- Denmark–South Korea relations
