= Gap =

Gap or The Gap may refer to various openings, vacant spaces, lacks or pauses:

== Natural features ==
- Gap (landform), a low point or opening between hills or mountains or in a ridge or mountain range
- Treefall gap, a spacing between large trees in a forest

== Places ==
- Gap, Alberta, Canada
- Gap, Hautes-Alpes, France
- Gap, North Carolina, United States
- Gap, Pennsylvania, United States
- Garmisch-Partenkirchen, Germany, a license plate code GAP
- Great Allegheny Passage (GAP), a hiking/biking trail stretching from Pittsburgh, Pennsylvania, to Cumberland, Maryland

== Organizations and businesses ==
- Air Philippines, ICAO designator GAP
- G Adventures, formerly Gap Adventures, Canadian travel company
- Gap Analysis Project, a US government project for wildlife conservation
- Gap Broadcasting Group
- Gap FC, a French football club
- Gap Inc., a clothing store chain
- Global Animal Partnership, for animal welfare
- Government Accountability Project, for US whistleblower protection
- Great Ape Project, advocating legal rights for great apes
- Group of Personal Friends (Grupo de Amigos Personales), an armed guard of the Socialist Party of Chile 1970-1973
- Group for the Advancement of Psychiatry, US
- Grupo Aeroportuario del Pacífico, a Mexican airport operator
- Gruppi di Azione Patriottica (Patriotic Action Groups), Italian WWII partisan group
- Gruppi di Azione Partigiana (Partisan Action Group), an Italian resistance group founded by Giangiacomo Feltrinelli
- Guyana Action Party
- Southeastern Anatolia Project (Güneydoğu Anadolu Projesi), a regional development project in Turkey
- The Great Atlantic & Pacific Tea Company, ticker symbol GAP

== Science and technology ==
- Band gap or "energy gap", the energy interval in which particles cannot propagate
- Gallium(III) phosphide, a semiconductor material
- Glyceraldehyde 3-phosphate, a 3-carbon molecule metabolite important in both glycolysis and the Calvin cycle
- Good agricultural practice, any collection of value-based agricultural practices
- GTPase-activating proteins, a family of regulatory proteins

=== Linguistics ===
- Gap, accidental gap, or lexical gap, a word or other form that does not exist in a language but could
- Gap, a kind of ellipsis, e.g.:
  - Gap is an instance of gapping
  - Parasitic gap, a kind of correlated ellipsis

=== Mathematics, computer science, and technology ===
- Air gap (networking), a security measure
- GAP (computer algebra system) (groups, algorithms and programming), a software package
- Generalized assignment problem
- Generic access profile, an interoperability protocol used in wireless telephony
- Gimp Animation Package, an extension for the GIMP
- Graph automorphism problem

== Other uses ==
- Gap (chart pattern), areas where no trading occurs in the stock market
- Gap (Mandaeism) or Gaf, a demon of the Mandaean underworld
- GAP insurance, a type of vehicle insurance
- Gap Mangione, or Gaspare Charles "Gap" Mangione, jazz pianist and bandleader
- Gap year, a prolonged period between life stages
- .45 GAP, the "Glock Automatic Pistol" cartridge
- iGap, an Iranian messaging app

== See also ==
- Gap theorem (disambiguation)
- Gaps (disambiguation)
- The Gap (disambiguation)
- GAAP (disambiguation)
