= Nabiha =

Danish singer-songwriter

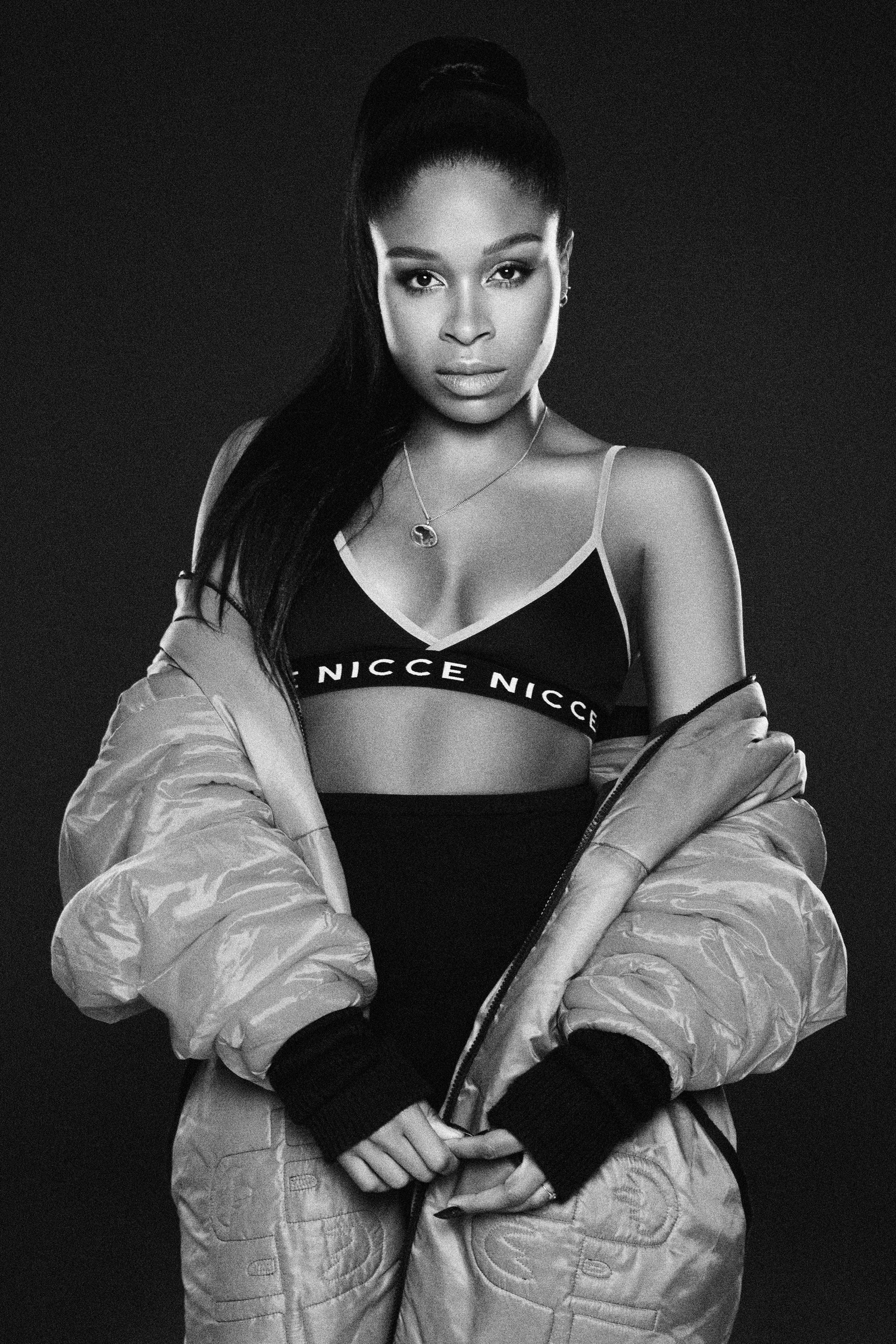
- Nabiha in 2017

Background information
- Also known as: Tiger Lily
- Born: Nabiha Bensouda; 1 September 1981 (age 45); Copenhagen, Denmark
- Genre: Pop
- Occupations: Singer-songwriter, musician
- Instrument: Vocals
- Years active: 2009–present
- Label: Sony Music
- Website: nabihamusic.com

Nabiha Bensouda (born 1 September 1981) is a Danish singer and songwriter.

== Career ==
”Deep Sleep", the first single from the album peaked as 4 on the Danish Tracklisten Singles Chart and was certified gold. Bensouda has already played a number of large venues, including opening for James Morrison at the Falconer Theatre in Copenhagen and playing at the Danish National Football stadium.

Nabiha was a support act for Rasmus Seebach on a sold-out tour. She also toured with James Morrison concert in Copenhagen, Jason Derulo's and Jamie Cullum's German tours. In February 2011 Nabiha toured all over Denmark with marked success.

In September 2011 Nabiha released the new international edit of her debut album now called More Cracks and included four new songs; "Never Played the Bass", "Sound of My Gun", "Can't Do Anything" and "Trouble" which went into high rotation on Danish radio stations. "Never Played the Bass" was very popular in urban, club and airplay charts and reached number 4 on Tracklisten and was certified gold. It was number one for 4 weeks in the Hungarian Singles Chart.

2012 Nabiha participated in the TV show Toppen af Poppen, together with six other established artists, where each one had to do their own interpretation of one of the other participants songs on the show. Nabiha did an interpretation of "Det' passer" and "Vodoo" among others.

Since then Nabiha has also toured the US with shows in Los Angeles and New York, Finland, Poland, Germany, Denmark and the UK and has had more than 19 syncs in the States, on shows such as Mobwives, Basketball Wives and Basketball Wives LA, SMASH, SoapTV and many more on the local Danish scene.

In 2013, Nabiha released her second album Mind the Gap. It went to number 10 on the album chart and straight to number 1 on the download BIT chart. It was written and produced with Nabiha's long-term music partner, Carl Ryden and Methe Buhl did A&R again. Nabiha and Carl Ryden also collaborated to write Mind the Gap with Mike Hamilton, Michelle Escoffery and Will Simms.

In 2014 Nabiha's single "Bang that Drum" was used as the title song for the 2014 European Men's Handball Championship. Nabiha performed at the opening ceremony and at the closing of event broadcast to 200 million people.

Nabiha's new single is called "Animals", which peaked at number one on the US dance charts.

== Awards and nominations ==
Since 2010 Nabiha has won or has been nominated at many music award shows.

Wins

- The Best African Achievement Awards: "Artist of the Year"
- EBBA 2013 – European Border Breakers Awards 2013 for album More Cracks

Nominations

- 5 nominations at the Danish Music Awards (Grammy) for "New Name of the Year", "Video of the Year", "Club hit of the year", "Album of the year", "Female artist on the year".
- P3 Guld (Danish National Radio Awards) for "New Talent of the Year" and "Listeners Hit of the Year"
- Zulu Awards "Female artist of the Year", "Best Female Artist of the Year" and "Hit of the Year"
- Danish Deejay Awards "Urban Release of the Year"
- GAFFA Awards "Hit of the year" and "Artist of the year"

== Discography ==
=== Albums ===
Year	Album	Peak chart positions
Year	Album	DEN
2010	Cracks	17
2011	More Cracks	13
2013	Mind the Gap	1

=== Singles ===
==== As lead artist ====
Year	Single	Peak chart positions									Certifications	Album
Year	Single	DEN	DEN Airplay	BE (Vl)	BE (Vl) Dance	BE (Vl) Tip	US Dance	HU Mahasz Top 40 Airplay Chart	HU Mahasz Top 40 Single Chart	IT Top 100 Airplay Chart		Album
2010	"Deep Sleep"	4	7	—	—	—	—	—	—	—	IFPI DK: Gold (download)	Cracks / More Cracks
2010	"The Enemy"	6	6	—	—	—	—	—	—	—	IFPI DK: Gold (download)	Cracks / More Cracks
2011	"Never Played the Bass"	4	3	—	35	12	37	1	1	—	IFPI DK: Gold (download); IFPI DK: Platinum (streaming)	Cracks / More Cracks
2012	"Mind the Gap"	1	1	37	27	2	—	2	2	—	IFPI DK: Platinum (download); IPPI DK: Platinum (streaming)	Mind the Gap
2013	"Ask Yourself"	14	2	—	—	—	—	—	—	—	IFPI DK: Gold (streaming)	Mind the Gap
2014	"Bang That Drum"	4	—	—	—	—	—	—	—	—	IFPI DK: Gold (streaming)	TBA
2014	"Animals"	3	—	—	—	—	1	—	—	59		TBA
"—" means the single was not released in that country.

==== As featured artist ====
Year	Single	Peak chart positions
Year	Single	DEN
2012	"Raise the Roof" (Hampenberg & Alexander Brown feat. Pitbull, Fatman Scoop & Nabiha)	8

==== Other charted songs ====
Year	Single	Peak chart positions	Album
Year	Single	DEN	Album
2012	"Woodoo"	30	From album Toppen Af Poppen 3 – Synger Sanne Salomonsen
2012	"Det passer"	26	From album Toppen Af Poppen 3 – Synger Johnson

=== Music videos ===
Song	Year
"Deep Sleep"	2010
"Trouble"	2011
"Never Played the Bass"	2012
"Mind the Gap"	2012
"Ask Yourself"	2013
"Bang That Drum"	2014
"Animals"	2014
