= Gore (segment) =

Sector of curved surface

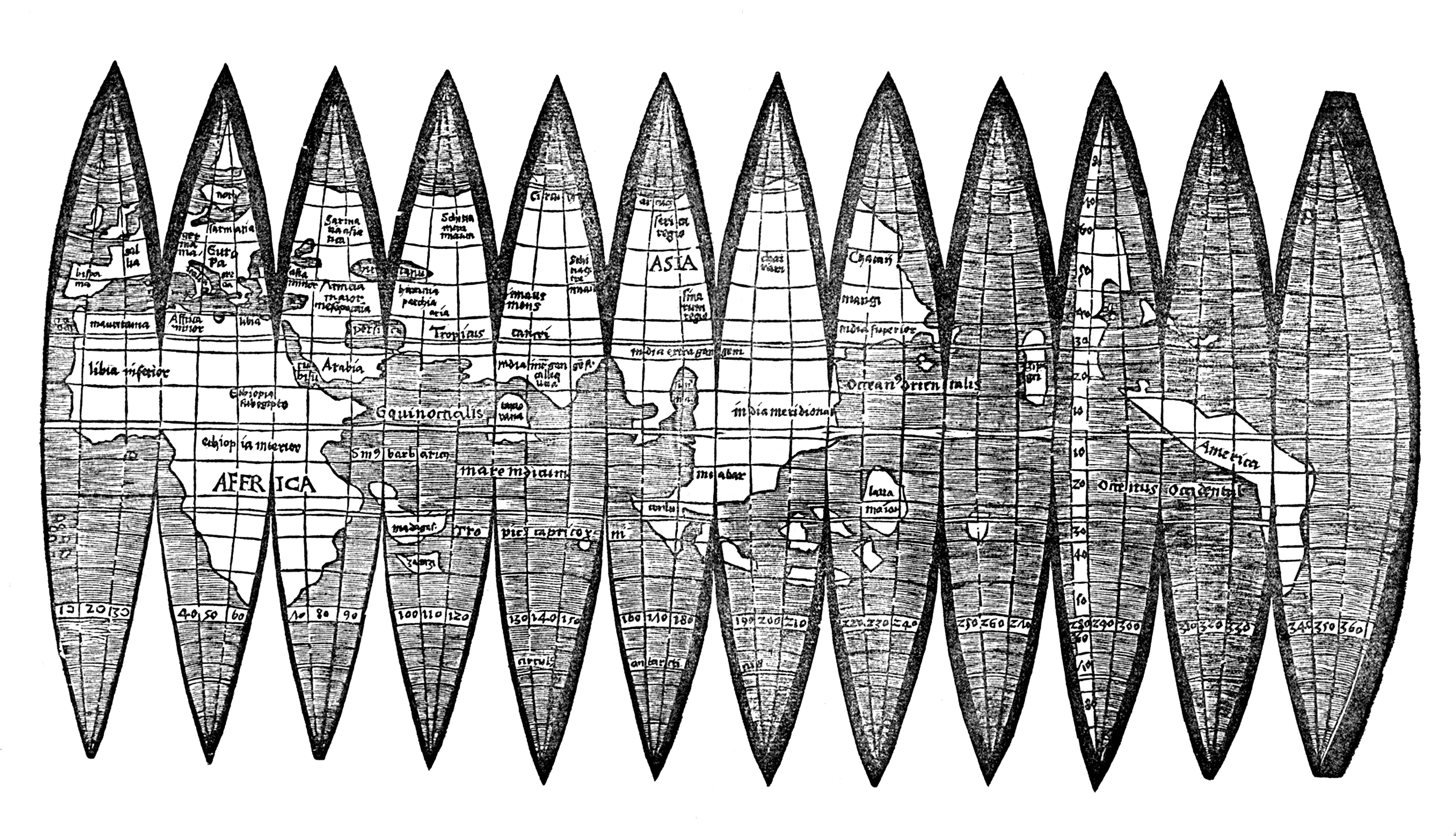
The gores of Waldseemüller's 1507 globe of the world, the first to use the name "America" (at right)

A gore is a sector of a curved surface or the curved surface that lies between two close lines of longitude on a globe and may be flattened to a plane surface with little distortion. The term has been extended to include similarly shaped pieces such as the panels of a hot-air balloon or parachute, or the triangular insert that allows extra movement in a garment (see Gore (fabrics)).

== Examples ==
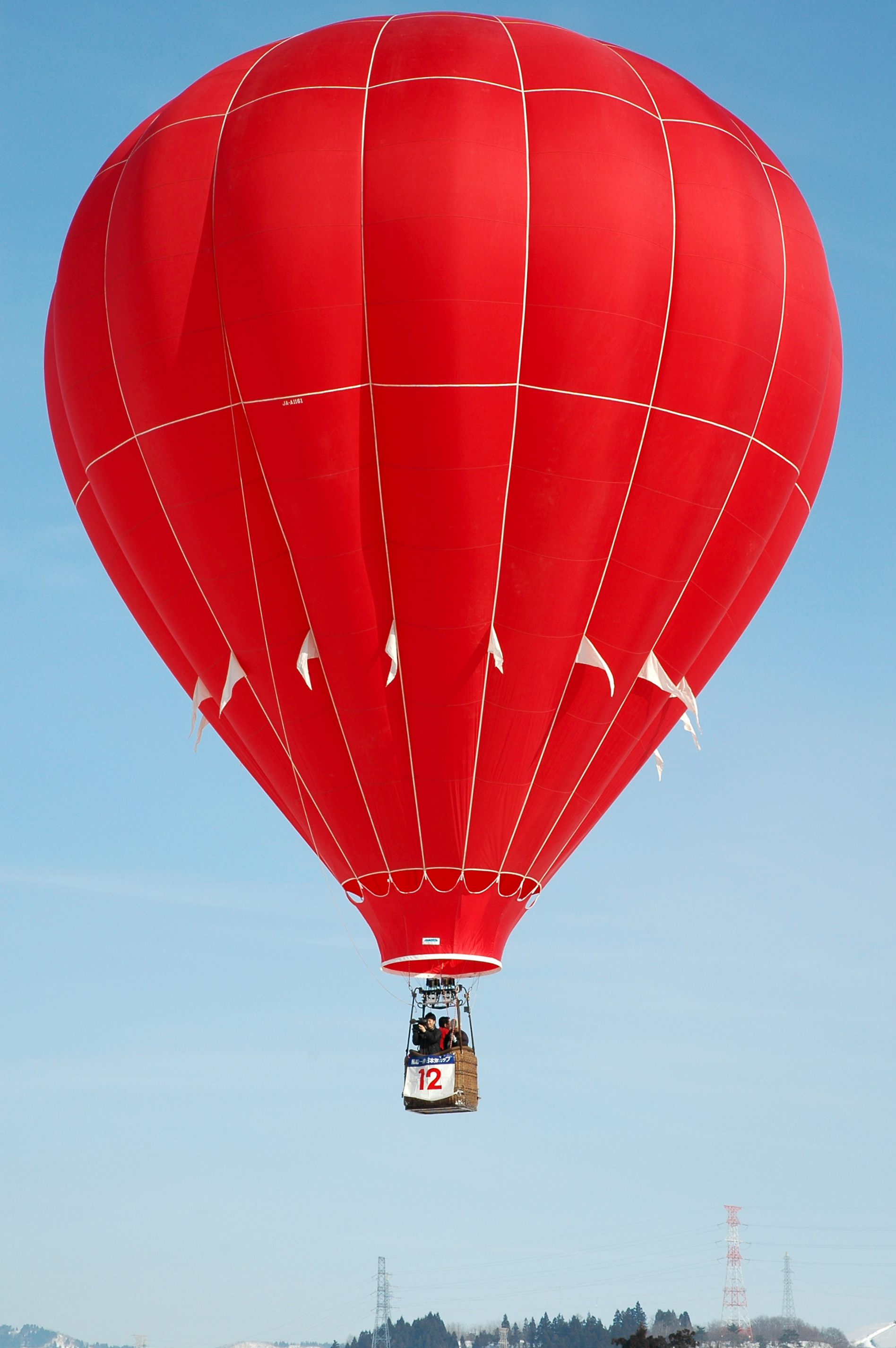
Red hot-air balloon, made from gores of material

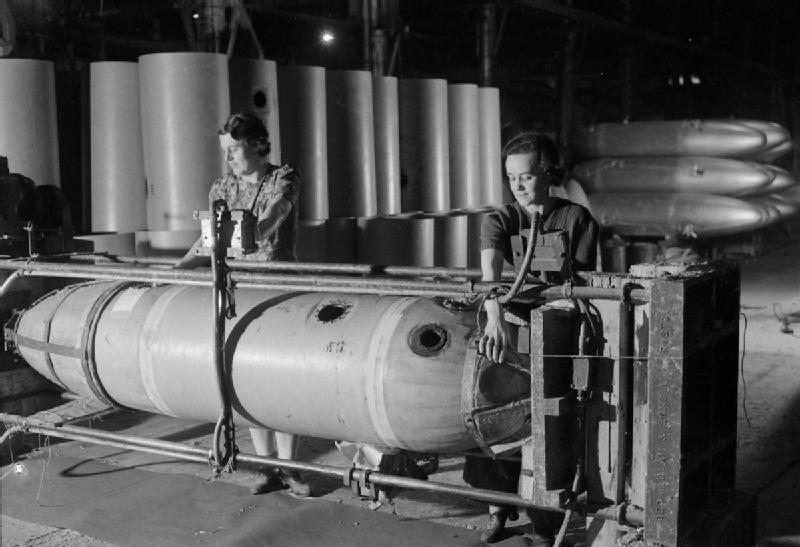
Single-use American WW II aircraft drop tanks, made of impregnated paper cylinders closed by gores formed into hemispheric shapes

- Globes of the Earth and the celestial sphere were first mass-produced by Johannes Schöner using a process of printing map details on 12 paper gores that were cut out then pasted to a sphere. This process is still often used. The gores are conveniently made to each have a width of 30 degrees of longitude matching the principal meridians from the South Pole and North Pole to the Equator.
- Parachutes and hot air balloons are made from gores of lightweight material. The gores are cut from flat material and stitched together to create various shapes.
- Pressure suit joints are often constructed of alternating gores and convolutes of material constrained by cables or straps along the sides of the joint, producing an accordion-like structure that flexes with nearly constant volume to minimize the mechanical work which must be done by the suit occupant.
- Corners in round duct-work can be created by welding or fixing gores of metal sheet to form a bend.
- Some designers use the stretched grid method to design gores that are cut out of weather-resistant fabric and then stitched together to form fabric structures.
