= TopGunn =

Danish rapper

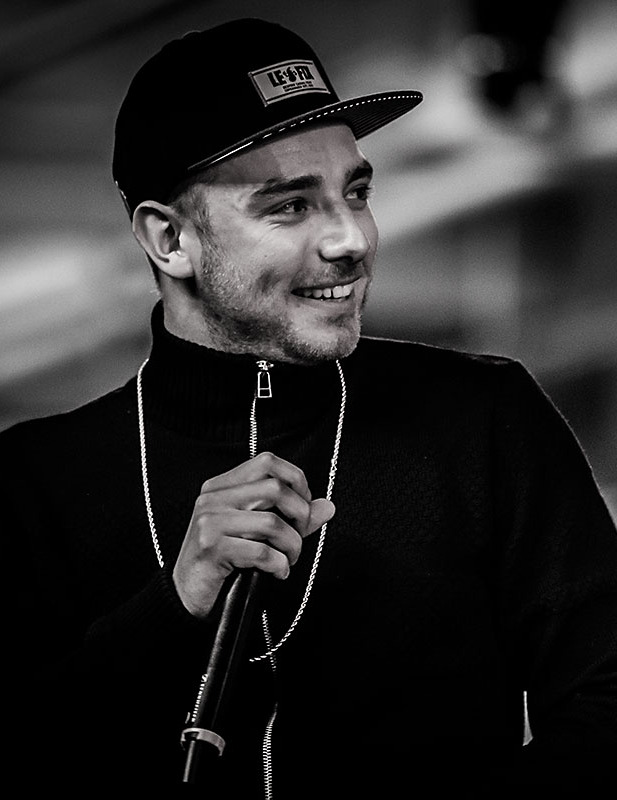

Background information
- Born: Oliver Gammelgaard Nielsen; 3 April 1991 (age 35); Frederiksberg, Copenhagen, Denmark
- Genres: Rap, dancehall
- Occupation: Rapper
- Years active: 2010–present
- Label: CHEFF Records

Oliver Gammelgaard Nielsen (born 3 April 1991), better known by his stage name TopGunn, is a Danish rapper and music producer from Nørrebro, Copenhagen, born in Frederiksberg, Copenhagen. He has also established his own label CHEFF Records.

== Career ==
Influenced by Danish dancehall scene, he published his first EP, Dansehallens Erobrer in 2010. Best known from the EP was the track "Averbaver" og "Gunmænd med pistoler". Through his residency in Ragnhildgade, he collaborated with Klumben in launching the latter's initial hit "Kriminel" which became an instant hit.

In addition TopGunn became part of Fuma Hi-Fi, with Firehouse which he produced in addition to contributing to them the tracks "Ingen Kokain" and "Xfactor" and with Nicholas Westwood (known as Kidd) most notably in Kidd's hit "Kysset med Jamel" and the ensuing "Kidd projektet". That also resulted in a 2012 documentary "Kidd Life".

TopGunn released his debut album on CHEFF Records in May 2013 called 21 after having success with singles "Hemligt nummer" and "Tilbud".

== CHEFF Records ==
CHEFF Records is a hip hop label started by TopGunn that included acts Kidd, Klumben and ELOQ. The labels biggest selling album thus far is "Kidd Greatest Hits" that also led to a series of gigs. TopGunn's dancehall partner Klumben, also had huge success with his 2012 album "Fra Klumben Til Pladen". It was produced by TopGunn in collaboration with Maffi Promotions. TopGunn was featured on the track "Xfactor".

== Discography ==
=== Albums ===
Year	Title	Peak positions
Year	Title	DEN
2013	21	6
2015	Ingen Andre	10
2019	1991	2
2020	Sas	1
2023	DK Goat	1

=== EPs ===
Year	Title	Peak positions
Year	Title	DEN
2026	Hej far	16

=== Singles ===
Year	Title	Peak positions	Album
Year	Title	DEN	Album
2013	"Tilbud"	33	21
2014	"Man kan ikke stole på en pige med en lille røv"	22	—N/a
2014	"Kongens have"	7	Ingen Andre
2014	"Mig & mit hoved"	23	Ingen Andre
2014	"6 Liter"	3	Ingen Andre
2015	"Veninder"	10	Ingen Andre
2015	"Dejlig"	5	Non-album singles
2016	"Dør"	18	Non-album singles
2016	"Længe siden"	11	Non-album singles
2017	"Fokus"	29	Non-album singles
2017	"Hyggesang"	16	Non-album singles
2018	"Million"	27	Non-album singles
2018	"Varm"	35	Non-album singles
2019	"Detaljen" (featuring Fouli)	12	1991
2019	"Hyg hver dag" (featuring Citybois)	14	1991
2019	"Nik & Jay" (featuring Benjamin Hav)	8	1991
2022	"Lågsus for evigt" (with Specktors and Tessa)	5	Non-album singles
2023	"For altid"	1	Non-album singles
2023	"10% mere"	7	Non-album singles
2023	"Lad mig ga"	24	Non-album singles
2023	"Copenhagen"	15	DK Goat
2023	"Bump" (featuring Lamin)	19	DK Goat
2024	"Du min"	36	Non-album singles
2026	"Falder du så falder jeg" (featuring Gobs)	27	Non-album singles

Featured in

Year	Single	Peak positions
Year	Single	DEN
2012	"Jeg brækker mig" (Sara & David på P3 featuring TopGunn, Barbara Moleko & Ivan Pedersen)	23
2014	"Dumt på dig" (Kato featuring TopGunn)	4
2021	"Sender mig til månen" (Cheff Records featuring Kidd, TopGunn and Klumb)	34
2023	"God pige" (Danser med piger featuring TopGunn)	1

Other charted songs

Year	Title	Peak positions	Album
Year	Title	DEN	Album
2020	"Sport" (with Branco)	1	Sas
2020	"No Skrubs" (featuring Medina)	4	Sas
2020	"Skriv Til Mig" (featuring Icekiid)	8	Sas
2020	"Mash"	10	Sas
2020	"Bella"	18	Sas
2020	"En Gang Mere" (featuring Josva and Pind)	22	Sas
2023	"Balancen" (featuring Kesi)	25	DK Goat
2023	"DK Goat" (featuring Kesi)	30	DK Goat
2026	"Dø med dig"	38	Hej far
