= Jarl Friis-Mikkelsen =

Danish actor, TV and radio host (born 1951)

- Born: December 1, 1951 (age 74); Aarhus, Denmark
- Citizenship: Danish
- Occupations: Actor, singer, film director, TV and radio host
- Spouses: Jacqueline Friis-Mikkelsen (married 1985-1989); Mari-Anne Jespersen (married 1994-1998); Susanne Pehrsson Friis-Mikkelsen (married 2009-present)
- Children: 3

Jarl Friis-Mikkelsen (born 1 December 1951) (Note: Altinget has his birth year as 1956) is a Danish actor, singer, film director, TV host and former head of entertainment on DR radio.

== Early life and education ==
He was born in Aarhus to a Norwegian mother and a Danish father, a lawyer. His mother died when Jarl was 11 years old, and his father was left to care for two children. He attended Old Hellerup Gymnasium. He studied at University of Copenhagen where he earned a masters degree in Danish and English. At the end of the 1970s he became notable on DR radio's P3 programme as part of the pop group Kester.

== TV and film career ==
=== 1980s ===
Jarl Friis-Mikkelsen had his debut on the Danish Eurovision competition in 1981 with Jørgen de Mylius. He was then host on TV shows such as Lørdagshjørnet (Saturday corner), Smil, det' lørdag (Smile, it's Saturday) and Schyy.. Det er Lørdag (Shh.. It's Saturday). While working on DR radio he met Ole Stephensen and together they developed the Brothers Øb & Bøv figurines. That paved the way for collaboration that resulted in the Walter and Carlo figurines and the Morten Korch parody Kampen om den røde ko (The battle for the red cow).

He was the entertainment manager on Kanal 2 from 1988 to 1990.

=== 1990s ===
In the 1990s he was a popular host on DR radio. He hosted his own talk show, Talkshowet, where he interviewed famous people from Denmark and abroad. Friis-Mikkelsen organized the quiz Skattefri Lørdag, which he co-hosted with model Tina Kjær. In the 1990s Friis-Mikkelsen played a part in the four Krummerne movies as the subservient and nervous career criminal Ivan. He also played a narcissistic host on the TV-show Charlot and Charlotte.

He was the head of entertainment on DR radio from 1994 until 1997. In 1996, together with Ole Stephensen he founded Skandinavisk Filmkompagni (Scandinavian Film Company), where he was Creative director and main stock holder until the company's sale to Monday Media in 2010.

=== 2000s ===
Jarl Friis-Mikkelsen resumed his collaboration with Ole Stephens on the wedding show Hjælp, skal vi giftes (Help, we are getting married). Later he started his collaboration with Casper Christensen. In addition to playing himself on the show, he directed several episodes of the show Langt fra Las Vegas (Far from Las Vegas). He contributed to several episodes of the show Klovn, created by Frank Hvam and Casper Christensen. In 2005 Jarl hosted the Danish Eurovision contest and in the later part of the decade he produced several episodes of the quiz A-Ha. In 2008 he was let go from DR radio. He went on to produce Øle & Jarl with Ole Stephensen on TV 2 Charlie. In 2009 he participated in TV 2's biographical and entertainment show Stjernene på slottet (Stars in the Castle).

=== 2010s ===
In 2011 he co-hosted what was called the Zulu Awards at the time (EchoPrisen today) with Casper Christensen. He was also host on the TV 2 Charlie show De Bedste Grin (The Biggest Laugh).

Han was a judge on the talent show Denmark has talent.

== Private life ==
Jarl Friis-Mikkelsen was married three times. From 1985–1989 he was married to model Jacqueline Friis-Mikkelsen, and from 1994–1998 he was married with actress Mari-Anne Jespersen. In 2009 he married Susanne Persson. He is father to Isabell (b. 1986), Liva (b. 2004) and Ella (b. 2011).

His oldest daughter married the comedian Casper Christensen in 2014.

== Filmography ==
=== Movies ===
| Year | Title | Role | Notes |
|---|---|---|---|
| 1985 | Walter og Carlo - op på fars hat | Carlo | Ole Stephensen played Walter. |
| 1986 | Walter og Carlo - yes, det er far | Carlo | Ole Stephensen played Walter. |
| 1987 | Kampen om den røde ko | Svend Åge Søndergaard | |
| 1989 | Walter og Carlo i Amerika | Carlo | Ole Stephensen is on the cast. Friis-Mikkelsen directed the film too. |
| 1991 | Krummerne | Ivan the criminal | Peter Schrøder played the criminal Boris. |
| 1992 | Krummerne 2 - Stakkels Krumme | Ivan the criminal | Peter Schrøder played the criminal Boris. |
| 1994 | Krummerne 3 - Fars gode idé | Ivan the criminal | Peter Schrøder played the criminal Boris. |
| 1997 | Sunes familie | Georg | |
| 2002 | Bertram og Co. | Onkel Georg | |
| 2006 | Krummerne - Så er det jul igen | Ivan the criminal | Peter Schrøder played the criminal Boris. |

=== TV shows ===
He directed the first season of Langt fra Las Vegas and contributed to the Danish sitcom Klovn.
