= Peter Frödin =

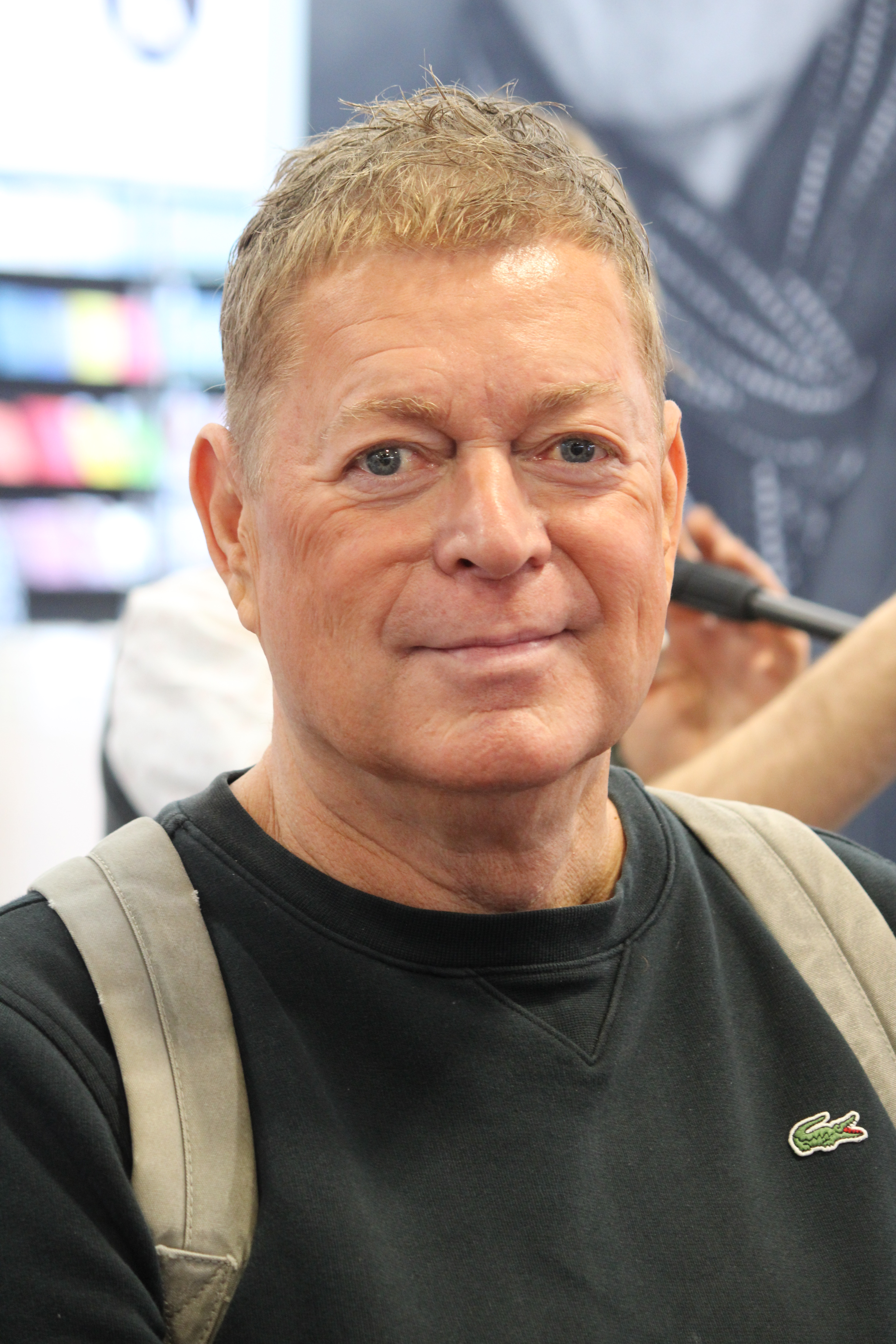
- Frödin in 2025
- Born: 7 January 1964 (age 62); Copenhagen, Denmark
- Occupations: Actor, comedian, singer
- Years active: 1984-present
- Partner: Jon Jørgensen (1996-present)

Peter Frödin (born 7 January 1964) is a Danish actor, comedian and singer. His career began in 1984 on Merkurteatret as an actor. Later he played with Paprika Steen, Hella Joof and Martin Brygmann on Cafe Teatret, which led to many years of cooperation in the comedy-groups Lex & Klatten (Saturday night satire show), and Det brune punktum. Together with Hella Joof, he hosted a show called Bullerfnis (1990–1992). He has had a lot of parts in Danish movies like Hannibal & Jerry, Motello, Mirakel, Grev Axel, Jul I Valhal and En kort en lang.

He is also known for participating in several TV-commercials for Tuborg and TDC.

The music from Lex & Klatten and Det brune punktum have been big radio-hits in Denmark where his talent as a singer has been revealed. Peter Frödin sang a song together with Jimmy Jørgensen that was called Vent på mig and was the most played song in the radio in the period from 1995 to 2010. In the TV-show called Her er dit liv on DR1 Jarl Friis Mikkelsen called Peter Frödin 'one of Denmark's best singers'.

Peter collaborated on Bent Fabricius-Bjerre's album Jukebox in 2004.

Peter has worked with Søren Østergaard and they've made a circus called Zirkus Nemo which is a 'comedy-circus' that tours Denmark in the summer months.

Frödin is openly gay، he has been in a relationship with Jon Jørgensen since 1996, they entered into a registered partnership in 2007
