= China's Got Talent series 3 =

China's Got Talent
- Series 3
- Hosted by: Cheng Lei
- Judges: Zhou Libo (Auditions, Semifinals); Annie Yi (Some auditions, Finals); Jerry Huang; Cui Yongyuan (Semifinals); Gao Xiaosong (Some auditions, Finals)
- Winner: Pan Qianqian
- Runner-up: Song Jiazheng

Release
- Original network: DragonTV
- Original release: November 13, 2011 – January 21, 2012

Series chronology
- ← Previous; Series 2 Next → Series 4

The third series of China's Got Talent, also known as Head & Shoulders China's Got Talent for sponsor reasons, premiered on DragonTV on November 13, 2011 with a look at the pre-audition process for the first time. The judges audition process for the third series premieres a week after.

== Special Guest ==
The first episode at the 3rd Season the show opened with special guest such as Tian Ma, (winner of the 2nd season and Daniela Anahi Bessia a famous Expat in China.

== Auditions ==
Auditions were held in Shanghai Concert Hall. Former judge Gao Xiaosong, Chinese modern dancer Huang Doudou, and series one winner, Liu Wei shared judging duties when Jerry Huang was absent. Actress and host Ni Ping shared hosting duties when Annie Yi was absent. The only judge that was not absent in all seven auditions was Zhou Libo, which was his last season as a judge.

Audition 1 (November 20, 2011)

Advanced

- Yan Guoqing, (age 22)
- Liu Zexian, magician (age 36)
- Luxy Boyz, performers (ages 28)
- Chen Lin, performer (age 41)
- Jiang Zhixue, belly dancer (age 39)
- Huo Chunyu, singer (age 28)

Rejected

- Wang Zhuhua, danger act (age 39)
- Jin Jiazhou, Kung Fu (age 39)
- Ying Zhangbing, Kung Fu (age 55)
- Li Xiang, singer (age 23)
- Zhang Yan, singer (age 27)
- Guo Daiwei, singer (age 27)
- Zheng Yue Jia, singer (age 20)
- Ma Xiaoyuan, dancer (age 25)
- Wang Hanxue, singer (age 21)

Audition 2 (November 27, 2011)

Advanced

- Silhouettes, dance group (ages 22)
- Nin Sijie, magician (age 4)
- Nan Weidong and Nan Weishi, vegetable instrumentalists (ages 40–43)
- Jiu Ji, performer (age 29)
- Skewers Group, singing group, (ages 24)
- Jin Yongqi and Cai Zi, dog act (age 57)
- , dog act (ages 4–23)
- Buddhists, singers (ages 30)
- , band (ages 10)
- You Songzhe, pianist (age 8)
- X-Boy, dancers (ages 9)
- Ren Qingyi, drummer (age 7)
- Liu Ying, singer (age 30)
- Wang Shengli, danger act (age 34)

Rejected

- Shi Qiuyi, parrot act (ages 4–30)
- Hai Tao, dog act (ages 3–54)
- Wen Wu, danger act (age 30)

Audition 3 (December 3, 2011)

Advanced

- Hei Shang Zhi, dancers (ages 23)
- An Lan, Michael Jackson impersonator (age 32)
- Si Qin, Overtone singer (age 35)
- Jiang Shangzhi, calligrapher, (age 57)
- Zeng Xiaolong, Tea pouring master (age 34)
- Wang Yu, opera singer (age 27)
- 80 Dance Group, comedic dance troupe (ages 21–26)

Rejected

- Yang Zhiyong, dancer (age 31)
- Ling Tongxin, whistler (age 51)
- Mei Xia, performer (age 43)
- Jiang Guangying, performer (age 21)
- Zhang Yong, performer (age 48)
- Huang Hua Da, Pen spinner (age 20)

Audition 4 (December 11, 2011)

Advanced

- Peng Weilun, street performer (age 23)
- Shi Tao and Qi Xiaomei, ballroom dancers (ages 55–65)
- NuNei Family, dancers (ages 15)
- Weilian Group, strength act, (ages 21–22)
- Wei Jun, erhu player (age 18)
- Zhou Kaikai, performer (age 20)
- Peace and Cavalry, singers (ages ?)
- Yang Sihui, singer (age 37)

Rejected

- , dancer (age 31)
- Shi Tao and Qi Xiaomei, sheep act (ages 8–58)
- Hulun Qinggeli, performer (age 22)
- , balance act (ages 52)
- Wang Ding Qiang, pig act (age 40)
- Liu Fei, performer (age 53)
- Dai Da Li, pole dancer (age 66)
- Pan Xi, male Lady Gaga singer (age 22)
- , cyclist/performer (age 25)
- Blue Man Group, Blue Man Group copycats (ages 22)
- Panda Hip-Hop, hip-hop group (ages 25)

Audition 5 (December 18, 2011)

Advanced

- Tang Ronghai, performer (age 24)
- Wu Zhao Jia, circus performer (age 29)
- Mr. Similar Group, dancers (ages 8)
- Ian, Chinese revolutionary singer, (age 33)
- Zhao Ruxuan, opera singer (age 30)
- Liu Minghe, singer (age 24)
- Beauty Fit, female bodybuilders/dancers (ages 26–29)
- Song Jiazheng, diabolo juggler (age 20)
- Yuang Yuanqing, professional yo-yo player (ages 21)
- Human Snake, dancers (ages 20–25)
- Crazy Mystic Vocal Group, vocal group (ages 31–35)

Rejected

- Zheng Xiaokang, singer (age 74)

Audition 6 (December 25, 2011)

Advanced

- Opera Nalakuvara, performers (ages 17–35)
- Wang Dong Lin and Co., impersonators (ages 38)
- Tian Guanhui, drummer (age 52)
- Pan Qianqian, female baritone singer, (age 24)
- Wanda and Linda Li, singers (ages 10)
- Guangzhou Academy of Fine Arts, dance group (ages 15–25)
- Magic Tone, performers (ages 22–24)
- Sister in Laws, belly-dancers (ages 32)
- Hu Er Xun, singer (ages 25)
- Tao Ping, human counting money machine (age 41)
- Han Dong, singer (age 25)
- Wang Jia, hullahoop act (age 26)

Rejected

None

Audition 7 (January 1, 2012)

Advanced

- Tian Ye, singer (age 28)
- Hot Baby Mamas, dancers (ages 25–55)
- Fang Riquan, Korean spinning streamer hat performer, (age 24)
- Yang Zhou, violinist (ages 21)
- Wong Sisters, dance group (ages 63–64)
- Exquisite Jade, performers (ages 28)
- Fan Zhongliang, performers (ages 57)
- Chen Zhiqiang, singer (ages 30)
- Inner Mongolia Acrobatic Troupe, performers (ages 27–34)
- 9 Chaoyang Grandmas, hip-hop dancers (age 51-60)
- Shen Ma and Co., magician (ages 27–28)
- He Xianwen, Kong Yiji/hip-hop dancer (age 18)
- Yang Chengjun, poet (age 48)

Rejected

- 501 Corp, performers (ages 24–41)
- DCOC, jumping rope performers (age 18-29)

== Top 14 Selection Show ==
This round is a new format for the show. Acts (with the exception of contestants who already had advanced or eliminated in the beginning of the show) need to perform second time for the judges at the Shanghai Arena who then pick select acts to move on to the semifinals in Beijing at Great Hall of the People.

Italics are wild cards that were given a second chance and be added to the top 14 which makes it 16.

Key	Winner	Runner-up	Finalist	Eliminated

Name/Name of Act	Age(s)	Genre	Act	Hometown	Position Reached
An Lan	32	Performing	Michael Jackson impersonator	Mianyang, Sichuan	Eliminated
Magic Tone	22-24	Performing	Strength Act	Henan and Shandong	Final (Top 4)
Guangzhou Academy of Fine Arts	15-25	Performing	Dance troupe	Guangzhou	Eliminated
Huo Chunyu	28	Singing	Singer	Hegang, Heilongjiang	Finals (Top 4)—Wild Card finalist
Human Snake	20-25	Performing	Modern dance	Guizhou, Yunnan	Finals
Ian	33	Singing	Singer	Sanya, Hainan but orig. from Wales	Eliminated
Jiu Ji	29	Performer	Circus performer	Beijing	Eliminated
Luxy Boyz	~28	Performing	Dance troupe	Taiwan	Eliminated
Pan Qianqian	24	Singing	Female baritone singer	Shandong, works in Beijing	Winner
Peace and Cavalry	25 and 30	Singing	Singing duo	Beijing according to CGT website (Harbin according to interviews)	Finals—Wild Card Finalist
Shi Tao and Qi Xiaomei	65 and 55	Performing	Ballroom dancers	Shanghai	Eliminated
Song Jiazheng	20	Performing	Diabolo juggler	Taiwan	Runner up
Tang Ronghai	24	Performer	Strength act	Guangxi	Finals
Wanda and Linda Li	8 and 10	Singing	Singers	Xishuangbanna, Yunnan	Finals
Yang Zhou	21	Performing	Violinist	Qingdao, Shandong	Eliminated
Zhao Ruxuan	30	Singing	Opera Singer	Shanghai	Eliminated

== Semifinals ==
The semifinals began on January 15, 2011. The Great Hall of the People in Beijing was the venue for the semifinals. Cui Yongyuan, a very popular Chinese host joins Zhou Libo and Jerry Huang as judges.

Rules When the contestant is performing, judges can press their buzzers if the judges dislike the performance. When all three buzzer is pressed, the contestant must stop.

When the contestant is finished with their performance, a media jury of 143 can vote by raising signs that were given to them: yes (blue-colored signs) or no (red-colored signs). The most votes from the jury's votes will be automatically be in the finals. For second finalist, each of three judges has a chance of giving 10 votes to the 7 remaining contestants. Contestant who gets the most votes advance to the final. For the third finalist, judges vote between the third and fourth place contestants, and choose the best of three.

Key	Buzzed Out	Judges' choice for third place	Advanced to the finals. Highest votes of the night	Finished in second place with the judges votes	Finished in third place; Winning the judges' choice.	Finished in fourth place; Losing the judges choice.

Italics indicate the second stage where each judges gave 10 points to their favorites. The contestants with the most votes combined with the jury points and judges' points will be the second finalist of the week.

=== Week 1 (Jan 15th, 2012) ===
Order	Performer	Act Description	Jury's Votes (of 143) + Judges Votes (of 30) = 173	Judges' Choices		
Order	Performer	Act Description	Jury's Votes (of 143) + Judges Votes (of 30) = 173	Huang	Zhou	Cui
1	Shi Tao and Qi Xiaomei	Ballroom dancers	75		—	—
2	Magic Tone	Strength act	103+10(Huang) +10(Zhou) = 123			—
3	Pan Qianqian	Female baritone singer	124	—	—	—
4	Yang Zhou	Violinist	81	—	—	—
5	Wanda and Linda Li	Singers	128	—	—	—
6	Jiu Ji	Circus performer	88	—	—	—
7	Peace and Cavalry	Singers	111	—	—	
8	Guangzhou Academy of Fine Arts	Dance troupe	87 + 10(Cui) = 97	—	—	—

=== Week 2 (Jan 16th, 2012) ===
Order	Performer	Act Description	Jury's Votes (of 143) + Judges Votes (of 30) = 173	Judges' Choices		
Order	Performer	Act Description	Jury's Votes (of 143) + Judges Votes (of 30) = 173	Huang	Zhou	Cui
1	Human Snake	Modern dance	111			—
2	Ian	Singer	87	—	—	—
3	Song Jiazheng	Diabolo juggler	138	—	—	—
4	Huo Chunyu	Singer	97 +10(Cui) = 107	—	—	
5	Tang Ronghai	Strength act	96 +10(Huang) +10(Zhou) = 116	—	—	—
6	Zhao Ruxuan	Opera singer	68		—	—
7	Luxy Boyz	Dance troupe	48	—	—	—
8	An Lan	Michael Jackson impersonator	87	—	—	—

== Finals ==
Guest performers and presenters

Season 6 of America's Got Talent's contestant Those Funny Little People performed with China's Got Talent series 1's semifinalist, Zhu Jie as she sang Over the Rainbow. Those Funny Little People also performed and sang It's Raining Men. Series 2's winner of Britain's Got Talent, George Sampson performer a hip-hop dance routine with Zhuo Jun, winner of China's Got Talent (series 2). Britain's Got Talent (Series 3)'s 4th place finisher, Stavros Flatley performed their Irish dance routine. Jai McDowall, winner of series 5's of Britain's Got Talent, performed "Time to Say Goodbye" with runner up of series 2 of China's Got Talent, Cai Hongping. Jai McDowall also performed With Or Without You off his debut studio album, Believe. Nathan Burton, a comedic magician from America's Got Talent's season 1 also performed.

Chinese-American comedian Joe Wong was a presenter.

Rules

Before the final 6 acts performed one last time, the judges picked two more contestants from the semifinals to the finals for second chance. They were Peace and Cavalry and Huo Chunyu. Each 8 acts will perform for the judges and the judges will decide who will make it to the next stage. It is based on best of three. The second stage is by text voting by the Chinese public and it will determine the final four. The third stage will determine who is the top 2 and this is picked by the judges. The last stage, 121 selected jury will determine who is the winner. The individual who reaches 61 points will declared winner.

Key	Yes to Second Stage	No to Second Stage	Winner	Runner-Up	Reached Final Four

Order	Performer	Act Description	Jury's Votes (of 121)-Final 2	Judges' Choices-1st stage		
Order	Performer	Act Description	Jury's Votes (of 121)-Final 2	Gao	Yi	Huang
1	Human Snake	Modern Dance	Not in top 2			
2	Pan Qianqian	Female baritone singer	69			
3	Magic Tone	Strength Act	Not in top 2			
4	Peace and Cavalry	Singing duo	Not in top 2			
5	Song Jiazheng	Diabolo juggler	52			
6	Huo Chunyu	Singer	Not in top 2			
7	Tang Ronghai	Strength Act	Not in top 2			
8	Wanda and Linda Li	Singers	Not in top 2			

Preceded by series 2 (2010)	China's Got Talent series 3 (2011-2012)	Succeeded by series 4 (2012)
