= China's Got Talent series 4 =

China's Got Talent
- Series 4
- Hosted by: Cheng Lei
- Judges: Jerry Huang; Dou Wentao; Xu Jinglei; Yang Wei; Gao Xiaosong; Annie Yi; Leon Lai
- Winner: Wang Jungru
- Runner-up: Duan Zhimin

Release
- Original network: DragonTV
- Original release: November 18, 2012 – January 27, 2013

Series chronology
- ← Previous; Series 3 Next → Series 5

The fourth series of China's Got Talent, sponsored by Head & Shoulders, premiered on DragonTV on November 18, 2012.

== Auditions ==
Auditions were held in Shanghai Concert Hall. In this series, it features four judges instead of three. Jerry Huang, Dou Wentao, Xu Jinglei, Leon Lai, Yang Wei, Gao Xiaosong, and Annie Yi has all been featured throughout the auditions.

Audition 1 (November 18, 2012)

Advanced

- Wei Wei, contortionist (age 17)
- Jintai Ming, slackwire walking (age 28)
- Shi Kejian and Ling Ling (dog), dog act (ages 55)
- Zhu Cailing, singer (age 50)
- Huang Xianzhong, bian lian in underwater (age 23)
- Pengpai Blacklight Group, blacklight performers (ages 25)
- Shi Lei and Jiao Jindong, shadowgraphers (ages 48-53)
- Li Peng, gymnast (age 44)
- Su's Street Dance Group, dance troupe (ages 21)
- Jing Jing, singer (age 45)

Rejected

- Kong Guohua, ventriloquist (age 29)
- Shaanxi Group, puppetry (ages 25)

Audition 2 (November 25, 2012)

Advanced

- JYD, dancers (ages 7-25)
- DaiFen Painting Performance, painters (ages 23-35)
- Latin Duo, dancers (ages 15)
- Li Shengcheng, singer (age 23)
- Chen Long, blowing "filled" cans and bottles down (age 47)
- Zhang Ruofeng, Contortionist/dancer (age 17)

Rejected

- Rainbow Sisters, dancers (ages 25-34)
- Icy Blue, acrobats (ages 21)
- Zhang Shuangjian, magician (age 22)

Audition 3 (December 2, 2012)

Advanced

- Qiao Jianding, parrot tricks (age 42)
- Peng Weilun, street performer (age 23)
- Tanshan Qiao Xiyang Dancing Group, dancers (ages 55-78)
- Qian Brothers, mouth sound effects (ages 31-33)
- Wild Thunder, technological performance group (ages 21-30)
- Ma Ziyue, singer (age 12)
- Lin Fei and Li Ming, disabled dancers (ages 21-23)
- Wang Jiang, circus performer (age 24)
- Kuo Shuzhen (Nancy Kuo), bellydancer

Rejected

- None

Audition 4 (December 9, 2012)

Advanced

- Zhu Binjie, Guan Yu impersonator (age 36)
- Peng Weilun, dog tightrope walking trainer (age 37)
- Li Li, Quan họ singer (age 37)
- San Qiang, mimic instruments (age 34)
- Song Fei, juggling ping pong balls in mouth (age 28)
- Zhao Limin, sand artist (age 20)
- Du Yuxin, opera singer (ages 45)
- Dai Dali, pole dancer (age 66)
- Wang Yingjiao, Bruce Lee impersonator (age 23)
- Ma Yun Lu and Ma Yun Po, dancers (age 18)
- Shanghai Taekwondo Group, Taekwondo troupe (ages 11-59)
- Liang Chen, ball juggler (age 23)
- Barry Cox, singer (orig. from Liverpool) (age 35)

Rejected

- Wushu Group, martial arts group (ages 22)
- Li Jiaqiang, singer while balancing an egg at the same time (age 40)

Audition 5 (December 16, 2012)

Advanced

- 1306, C-pop impersonators (ages 30)
- Wang Jungru, acrobat (age 17)
- Joyous Group, singers (ages 7-35)
- Sweethearts, acrobats (ages 34)
- Li Daming and Ha Lei (dog), dog act (ages 4-59)
- Zhang Zichong and Li Shi, poppers (ages 21-29)
- VIVA Choir, choir group (ages 21)
- Zhao Hanlong, juggler (age 24)

Rejected

- Anna, singer/dancer (age 26)
- Bai Shiwei, hand noise specialist (age 22)
- Zhu Yongsheng and Zhu Lin, wolf trainers (ages 10-55)

Audition 6 (December 23, 2012)
Special guests performance: The Voice of China contestant, Ping An and series 1 winner Liu Wei sang Liu's song "Make your Mark" (in Chinese: 梦想的符号). Liu dedicate the song to contestants who want to make their dream come true on China's Got Talent's stage.

Advanced

- Chen Jiajun, singer (age 32)
- Xi'an Belly Dance Company, belly dancing troupe (ages 23)
- Mogu Xiao Su, singers (ages 4-26)
- UVSENSE, aerialists (orig. from Russia) (ages 30)
- Fairy Tale, band (ages 6-30)
- Xinjiang Second Generation, Uyghur folk dance (ages 30)
- Yan Xu, singer (age 23)
- Li Chang Chun, beatbox sound effects (age 27)

Rejected

- Cui Runquan, robotic noddle peeler inventor (age 37)
- Zhou Bin and Pluto (dog), skating dog act (ages 1-30)
- Xiao Can, cross dresser (age 21)
- Huayang Ballroom Dancers, ballroom dancer (ages 51-66)
- Shen Qingchun, dancer (ages 39)
- Su Chuandong, balancing act (age 65)
- Liu Long, acrobat (age 24)
- Pei Qiuming, diabolo juggler (age 66)
- Wuhan Kite Whip Association, large spinning top whippers (age 59)

Audition 7 (December 30, 2012)

Advanced

- Jiu Ji, light painter (age 30)
- Tian Weiwei, belly dancer (age 22)
- Zhang Qianyun, opera singer (age 21)
- Duan Zhimin, yo-yo player (age 25)
- Xiang Qianhe, knife juggler (age 49)
- Tibetan Choir, choir group (ages 16)
- Deng Feihu, slingshot specialist (age 41)

Rejected

- Yuan Bao, singer with a snake (age 5)
- Wen Rongguang, rapper (age 68)
- China Pole Dancing Duo, pole dancers (ages 25-26)

Audition 8 (January 6, 2012)

Advanced

- Shi Feng, magician (age 28)
- Mani Bros., contortionist (age 20)
- Baier Na and Uncle, singer (ages 6-24)
- Song Wen and Liu Xu, dancers (ages 20-25)
- Zhang Jinlai, acrobat (age 49)
- Shenyang Fantasy Dance Group, Glowlight dance group (ages 25-30)
- Dong Jilan, dancer (age 20)
- Hong Bule, singers (ages 22)
- WHO Duo, Diabolo jugglers (ages 26-27)
- Hua Zi, singer/guitarist (age 31)

Rejected

- Zhang Zheng, singer (age 25)
- Zheng Jianpeng, singer (age 28)
- Dong Dong, exercise routine (ages 21)
- Xu Xiaomin, singer (age 56)

== Top 16 Summary ==
The top 16 were shown at the end of January 6 episode. They will be performing in Beijing at Great Hall of the People.

Key	Winner	Runner-up	Finalist	Eliminated in Semi-finals	Wildcard

Name/Name of Act	Age(s)	Genre	Act	Hometown	Position Reached
Wei Wei	17	Performing	Contortionist	Changchun, Jilin	Eliminated
Jing Jing	45	Singing	Singer	Beijing	Eliminated
Latin Duo	~15	Dancing	Dance duo	Beijing and Hong Kong	Finalist
Zhang Ruofeng	17	Performing	Contortionist/dancer	Beijing	Finalist
Ma Ziyue	12	Singing	Singer	Chengwu County, Shandong	Wildcard
Lin Fei and Li Ming	21-23	Performing	Disabled dancers	Changping District, Beijing	Eliminated-Lost text-voting's votes
Li Peng	44	Performing	Gymnast	Tianjin	Finalist
Yan Xu	23	Singing	Singer	Shanxi	Eliminated
Tian Weiwei	22	Dancing	Bellydancer	Wuhan	Eliminated
Qian Brothers	31-33	Performing	Mouth sound effects	Taipei	Eliminated
Wang Jungru	17	Performing	Acrobat	Wuhan, Hubei	WINNER
Zhang Qianyun	21	Singing	Opera Singer	Beijing	Wildcard
Dong Jilan	20	Dancer	Ethnic dancer	Yunnan	Finalist-Winning text voting's votes
Duan Zhimin	25	Performing	Yo-Yo player	Taiwan	Runner-up
Tibetan Choir	~16	Singing	Choir Group	Jinan, Shandong	Lost Judges' votes
Shenyang Fantasy Dance Group	25-30	Technological performing	Glowlight dance group	Shenyang, Liaoning	Eliminated

== Semifinals ==
The semifinals began on January 13, 2013. The Great Hall of the People in Beijing was the venue for the semifinals.

Rules When the contestant is performing, judges can press their buzzers if the judges dislike the performance. When all 4 buzzers is pressed, the contestant must stop.

When the contestant is finished with their performance, a media jury of 100 can vote by raising their signs that was given to them. The most votes from the jury's votes will be automatically be in the finals. For second finalist, each of 4 judges has a chance of giving 10 votes to the 7 remaining contestants. The contestant that gets the most votes advance to the final. For the third finalist, judges vote between the third and fourth place contestants, and choose the best. If the result is tied, it goes to the public vote.

Key	Buzzed Out	Judges' choice for third place	Advanced to the finals. Highest votes of the night	Finished in second place with the judges votes	Finished in third place; Winning the text voting choice.	Finished in fourth place; Losing the text voting choice.

Italics indicate the second stage where each judges gave 10 points to their favorites. The contestants with the most votes combined with the jury points and judges' points will be the second finalist of the week.

=== Week 1 (Jan 13, 2013) ===
Order	Performer	Act Description	Jury's Votes (Round 1)	Jury's Votes (Round 2)	Judges' Choices (Final Round)			
Order	Performer	Act Description	Jury's Votes (Round 1)	Jury's Votes (Round 2)	Huang	Lai	Xu	Dou
1	Zhang Ruofeng (Note: Since Zhang Ruofeng and dancing duo, Lin Fei and Li Ming got the same votes, 97, the media jury had to vote again.)	Contortionist/dancer	87+10(Xu)=97	91	—	—	—	—
2	Wang Jungru	Acrobat	93	Advanced in Round 1	—	—	—	—
3	Shenyang Fantasy Dance Group	Glowlight dance group	69	Eliminated	—	—	—	—
4	Jing Jing	Singer	59	Eliminated	—	—	—	—
5	Dong Jilan (Note: Since judges were deadlock in the final round, both Dong Jilan and dancing duo, Lin Fei and Li Ming will be voted by the public via text voting.)	Ethnic Dancer	75+10(Dou)+10(Huang)=95	Not the highest vote getter in Round 2		—	—	
6	Qian Brothers	Mouth sound effects	71	Eliminated	—	—	—	—
7	Lin Fei and Li Ming	Disabled dancers	87+10(Lai)=97	52	—			—
8	Ma Ziyue	Singer	85	Eliminated	—	—	—	—

=== Week 2 (Jan 20, 2013) ===
Key	Buzzed Out	Judges' choice for third place	Advanced to the finals. Highest votes of the night	Finished in second place with the judges votes	Finished in third place; Winning the judges' choice.	Finished in fourth place; Losing the judges' choice.

Italics indicate the second stage where each judges gave 10 points to their favorites. The contestants with the most votes combined with the jury points and judges' points will be the second finalist of the week.

Order	Performer	Act Description	Jury's Votes (Round 1)	Judges' Choices (Final Round)			
Order	Performer	Act Description	Jury's Votes (Round 1)	Huang	Lai	Xu	Dou
1	Tian Weiwei	Dancer	62	—	—	—	—
2	Zhang Qianyun	Opera Singer	72	—	—	—	—
3	Duan Zhimin	Yo-Yo player	90+10(Lai)+10(Huang)=110	—	—	—	—
4	Latin Duo	Latin dancers	96	—	—	—	—
5	Li Peng	Gymnast	94+10(Duo)=104				
6	Wei Wei	Contortionist/dancer	74	—	—	—	—
7	Yan Xu	Singer	58+10(Xu)=68	—	—	—	—
8	Tibetan Choir	Choir	84	—	—	—	—

== Finals (Venue: Mercedes-Benz Arena) ==
Rules

Before the final 6 acts performed one last time, the judges picked two more contestants from the semifinals to the finals for second chance. They were Ma Ziyue and Zhang Qianyun. Each 8 acts will perform for the judges and the judges will decide who will make it to the next stage. It is based on best of six. The second stage is by text voting by the Chinese public and it will determine the final four. The third stage will determine who is the top 2 and this is picked by the judges. The last stage, 101 selected jury will determine who is the winner. The individual who reaches 51 points will declared winner.

Key	Yes to Second Stage	No to Second Stage	Winner	Runner-Up	Reached Final Four

Order	Performer	Act Description	Jury's Votes (of 101)-Final 2	Judges' Choices-1st stage					
Order	Performer	Act Description	Jury's Votes (of 101)-Final 2	Huang	Yang	Lai	Xu	Gao	Dou
1	Zhang Ruofeng	Contortionist/dancer							
2	Zhang Qianyun	Opera singer							
3	Latin Duo	Dancing							
4	Wang Jungru	Acrobat	55						
5	Duan Zhimin	Yo-Yo player	46						
6	Ma Ziyue	Singer							
7	Li Peng	Gymnast							
8	Dong Jilan	Ethnic Dancer							

Preceded by series 3 (2011-2012)	China's Got Talent series 4 (2012-2013)	Succeeded by series 5 (2013)
