= China's Got Talent series 2 =

China's Got Talent
- Series 2
- Hosted by: Cheng Lei; Yang Lan (Finals)
- Judges: Gao Xiaosong (Until Audition 3); Zhou Libo; Annie Yi; Antonio Chen (Audition 3); Jerry Huang (Audition 4-8, Finals); Yang Lan (Semifinals)
- Winner: Zhuo Jun
- Runner-up: Cai Hongping

Release
- Original network: MediaCorp Channel U
- Original release: November 1, 2011 – February 5, 2012

Series chronology
- ← Previous; Series 1 Next → Series 3

The second series of China's Got Talent, also known as Head & Shoulders China's Got Talent for sponsor reasons, premiered on MediaCorp Channel U on November 1, 2011.

== Auditions ==
Auditions were held in Shanghai Concert Hall. During the third audition recorded on May 9, Judge Gao Xiaosong was detained by Beijing police on drunk driving charges and was sentenced to six months in jail. Taiwanese music composer Antonio Chen was announced as a replacement temporarily. Audition clips with either Gao or Chen were broadcast respectively. On November 22, Jerry Huang was announced to be a judge for the rest of this series.

Audition 1 (November 1, 2011)

Advanced

- Zhang Zhiwei, color-tube dancing (age 17)
- Chen Yaoyao, singer (age 20)
- HIT Robots, performer
- Zhao Yonghua, Bian lian
- Pets Model, animal act (ages 2-7)
- Tang Kangmin, Yi traditional instrument performer (age 23)
- Slam Dunk Chinese Dragon, exhibition basketball team
- Old Tigers, singers (ages 59-61)
- P.M.C, hip-hop team
- Yong Mengting, disco dancer (age 19)
- Hu Qizhi, street artist (age 30)
- Lu Yulong, technological performance artist (age 16)
- Bai Shuying, Michael Jackson impersonator (age 65)
- Shenzhen Migrant Workers Hip-Hop Group (re-appearance), Hip Hop Dance troupe

Rejected

- Zhao Binglin, acrobat with violin (age 62)
- Xiao Xiao, singer

Audition 2 (November 8, 2011)

Advanced

- Tian Ye, singer (age 27)
- Zhao Kai and Tuan Tuan, dancer (ages 21 and 4)
- Tse Chin-lui and Tse Chin-tung, band (ages 21 and 16)
- La Mei, dancers (ages 38-52)
- Super-X, dancers (age 21-27)
- Wu Yongqing, singer (age 19)
- Chang Gan, dancer (age 31)
- Xue Qiaoping, traditional opera "shuaya" performer
- Yan Na'na and Yan Liang, dancers
- Guo Siyu, singer (age 25)

Rejected

- Li Xiuying, singer
- He Fan Wenhao, dancer
- Hula Girls, dancers (ages 21-28)
- Guo Lizhong and Guo Fuwei, band (ages 38 and 7)

Audition 3 (November 15, 2011)

Advanced

- Pan Chenghao, Michael Jackson impersonator (age 7)
- Zhong Xiuquan, dancer (age 74)
- Mr. Miss, band (ages 21-25)
- Cong Sen, body dancer (age 28)
- Modern Queue, dancers (ages c.23)
- Final Power, body strength performers (ages 24 and 25)
- Allen, from Ukraine, singer (age 26)
- Cai Dinglun, Chinese characters stroke speed counter (age 31)
- Zhang Mingkui, guitar singer (age 29)

Rejected

- Huoyunxieshen, dancers (ages c.25)
- Pan Yuelin, singer (age 7)
- Cao Jianmiao, traditional instrument suona performer (age 30)
- Xiong Jun, cooking with bare hands (age 45)
- Chen Chun, magician (age 27)
- Tang Yi, singer (age 51)

Audition 4 (November 22, 2011)

Advanced

- Transformers Dancers, dancers (ages c.25)
- Zhang Ping, bodybuilder (age 54)
- McKesson (French-Chinese), jazz dancer (age 27)
- Yu Heqing, singer in upside down position (age 26)
- Shi Feng, ventriloquist (age 34)
- Wang Zhaoli, opera singer (age 84)
- Xi Yue, singer
- Cai Hongping, singer (age 55)
- Wang Zhonghua, strength act (age 32)

Rejected

- Tian Xigui, bird act (ages 4-79)
- Xu Ke, dog act (ages 6-31)
- Huang Xishan, dancing with a tiger stuffed toy (age 73)
- Yang Baoshan, basketball act, poet, singer (age 40)

The show was pre-empted on November 29, 2011 due to the live telecast of the 2011 Mnet Asian Music Awards.

Audition 5 (December 6, 2011)

Advanced

- Countryside 456, dancers (ages 42-64)
- Wang Aifeng, singer (age 38)
- Zheng Guigui, disabled pianist (age 20)
- Wang Hailiang and Hu Mengzhou, band (ages 22 and 25)
- Uudam, singer (age 12)
- Four Old Swans, ballet dancers (ages c.69)
- Pang Tak-Ming, escape artist (age 22)
- Rongerjia, Avatar impersonator, singer (age 26)
- Power Men, strength act, dancers (ages 21-24)
- Ma Shengzhou, strength act (age 43)
- Ling Chunjiang, strength act (age 36)

Audition 6 (December 13, 2011)

Advanced

- Yang Dongyu, singer, impersonator (age 30)
- Bi Huixian, singer (age 38)
- Zhuo Jun, popper (age 19)
- Dong Yunrong, singer (age 68)
- Wei Qiling and Wei Qimiao, strength act (age 21)
- SMU Dragon Dance Team, Dragon dancers (ages c.20)
- An Dong, strength act (age 39)
- Xiang Yanhong, opera singer (age 43)
- Wang Yanli, singer (age 39)
- Wang Fang, rapper (age 24)

Rejected

- Ling Zhenghui, singer (age 47)
- Meng Kai, singer (age 30)
- Cheng Changying and Xu Mingqing, dancers (ages 70 and 39)
- Zheng Rongrong and "Lailai" the dog, dog singer (ages 26 and 1/2)

Audition 7 (December 20, 2011)

Advanced

- Wang Long, ventriloquist (age 25)
- Ma Lanhua, singer (age 32)
- Yuan Menglong and Ye Huilian, band (age )
- Zhang Fenli, (age 40)
- Zhao Dapeng, Liu Xianhui and Zhao Tianzhen, singers and dancers (age 32, 33, 12)
- Yan Xi and Kungfu Pop, kungfu dancer (age 26)
- Shao Meiling, magician (age 26)

Rejected

- Li Shoulong, Wushu act (age 41)
- Zhang Yuhua, singer (age 38)

Audition 8 (December 27, 2011)

Advanced

- Shanghai Caster Crew, hip hop group (ages c.24)
- Song Sulang, singer (age 60)
- Qua'er Troupe, wushu group (ages c.30)
- Guangming 1987 Band, band (ages c.44)
- ?, singer (ages 59)
- ?, yodeler (ages 21)
- Gong Ziyi, singer (ages 22)
- ?, animal impressionist (ages 54)
- ?, beatboxer (ages 23)
- Zhe Hong, singer (ages 18)

Rejected

- Feng Yichang, singer (ages 33)
- ?, Ostrich egg ocarina player (ages 63)

== Semifinals ==
The semifinals began on January 3, 2012. The Great Hall of the People in Beijing was the venue for the semifinals. Yang Lan, a very popular Chinese host joins Zhou Libo and Annie Yi as judges.

Rules

A media jury are involved. Basketball star, Yao Ming was invited as a jury member in the first semifinals only. Yao's votes will be added to the media jury's votes for the overall votes. The most votes from the jury's votes will be automatically be in the finals. For second finalist, each of three judges has a chance of giving 10 votes to any one of the 7 remaining contestants. Contestant who gets the most votes advance to the final. For the third finalist, voting is based on best of three.

| Key | Judges' choice for third place | Advanced to the finals. Highest votes of the night | Finished in second place with the judges votes | Finished in third place; Winning the judges' choice. | Finished in fourth place; Losing the judges choice. |

Italics indicate the second stage where each judges gave 10 points to their favorites. The contestants with the most votes combined with the jury points and judges' points will be the second finalist of the week.

=== Week 1 (January 3 & 10, 2012) ===
| Order | Performer | Act Description | Jury's Votes (of 110) | Judges' Choices | | |
| Order | Performer | Act Description | Jury's Votes (of 110) | Yang | Yi | Zhou |
|---|---|---|---|---|---|---|
| 1 | Countryside 456 | Dance troupe | 53+10(Yao) | — | — | — |
| 2 | Hu Qizhi | Street Performer | 96+9(Yao) | — | — | — |
| 3 | Cai Hongping | Singer | 73+9(Yao)+10(Yi)+10(Zhou) | — | — | — |
| 4 | Lu Yulong | Technological performance artist | 42+7(Yao) | — | — | — |
| 5 | Zheng Guigui | Disabled pianist | 84+10(Yao) | | — | — |
| 6 | Pang Tak-Ming | Escape Artist | 67+9(Yao) | — | — | — |
| 7 | Wang Aifeng | Singer | 26+(Yao did not give the votes) | — | — | — |
| 8 | Uudam | Folk Singer | 73+10(Yao)+10(Yang) | — | | |

=== Week 2 (January 17 & 31, 2012) ===
| Order | Performer | Act Description | Jury's Votes (of 100) | Judges' Choices | | |
| Order | Performer | Act Description | Jury's Votes (of 100) | Yang | Yi | Zhou |
|---|---|---|---|---|---|---|
| 1 | Bai Shuying | Michael Jackson impersonator | 84 | — | — | |
| 2 | Wu Yongqing | Singer | 29 | — | — | — |
| 3 | Zhuo Jun | Popper | 96 | — | — | — |
| 4 | Tang Kangmin | Yi traditional instrument performer | 78 | — | — | — |
| 5 | An Dong | Strength Act | 74+10(Yi)+10(Zhou) | — | — | — |
| 6 | Xiang Yanhong | Opera Singer | 60 | — | — | — |
| 7 | Kungfu Pop | Kungfu troupe | 75+10(Yang) | | | — |
| 8 | Xi Yue | Singer | 30 | — | — | — |

== Finals (February 5, 2012) ==
World-renowned and Britain's Got Talent runner up, Susan Boyle perform two songs; "Who I Was Born To Be" and "I Dreamed a Dream" at Shanghai Stadium. Also Britain's Got Talent finalist Razy Gogonea performed his Matrix routine. Popular Mandopop singer Han Geng also performed his song "In A Dream."

Rules

Before the final 6 acts performed one last time, the judges picked two more contestants from the semifinals to the finals for second chance. They were Pang Tak-Ming and Tang Kangmin. Each 8 acts will perform for the judges and the judges will decide who will make it to the next stage. It is based on best of three. The second stage is by text voting by the Chinese public and it will determine the final four. The third stage will determine who is the top 2 and this is picked by the judges. The last stage, 100 selected jury will determine who is the winner. The individual who reaches 51 points will declared winner.

| Key | Yes to Second Stage | No to Second Stage | Winner | 2nd Place | Reached Final Four |

| Order | Performer | Act Description | Jury's Votes (of 100)-Final 2 | Judges' Choices-1st stage | | |
| Order | Performer | Act Description | Jury's Votes (of 100)-Final 2 | Huang | Yi | Zhou |
|---|---|---|---|---|---|---|
| 1 | Kungfu Pop | Kungfu troupe | Not in top 2 | | | |
| 2 | Cai Hongping | Singer | 49 | | | |
| 3 | Hu Qizhi | Street Artist | Not in top 2 | | | |
| 4 | Tang Kangmin | Yi traditional instrument performer | Not in top 2 | | | |
| 5 | Zhuo Jun | Popper | 51 | | | |
| 6 | Pang Tak-Ming | Escape Artist | Not in top 2 | | | |
| 7 | An Dong | Strength Act | Not in top 2 | | | |
| 8 | Uudam | Singer | Not in top 2 | | | |

== Series 2 Round Summary (Top 16) ==
| Key | Winner | Runner-up | Finalist | Eliminated |

| Name/Name of Act | Age(s) | Genre | Act | Hometown | Position Reached |
|---|---|---|---|---|---|
| Zheng Guigui | 20 | Performing | Disabled pianist | Henan | Lost the Judges' choice |
| Uudam | 12 | Singing | Folk singer | Hailar District, Inner Mongolia | Final (Top 4) |
| Lu Yulong | 16 | Performing | Technological performance artist | Shenzhen | Semifinal |
| Hu Qizhi | 30 | Performing | Street Artist | United States | Final (Top 4) |
| Pang Tak-Ming | 23 | Performing | Escape Artist | Hong Kong | Finals (2nd Chance) |
| Wang Aifeng | 38 | Singing | Singer | Jinzhou, Liaoning | Semifinal |
| Cai Hongping | 55 | Singing | Singer | Shanghai | Runner Up |
| Countryside 456 | 42-64 | Performing | Dancer Troupe | Shanghai | Semifinal |
| Xiang Yanhong | 43 | Singing | Opera Singer | Hubei | Semifinal |
| Bai Shuying | 65 | Performing | Michael Jackson impersonator | Beijing | Lost the Judge's choice |
| Zhuo Jun | 19 | Performing | Popper | Nanning, Guangxi | Winner |
| Tang Kangmin | 23 | Performing | Yi traditional instrument performer | Shanghai | Final (2nd Chance) |
| Xi Yue | 32 | Singing | Singer | Beijing | Semifinal |
| Kungfu pop | c.24 | Performer | Kungfu group | Sichuan | Finals (2nd Chance) |
| An Dong | 39 | Performing | Strength Act | Dalian, Liaoning | Final |
| Wu Yongqing | 19 | Singing | Singer | Hefei, Anhui | Semifinal |

| Preceded by series 1 (2010) | China's Got Talent series 2 (2011) | Succeeded by series 3 (2011-2012) |
