= China's Got Talent series 1 =

China's Got Talent
- Series 1
- Hosted by: Cheng Lei; Cao Kefan (Only in Semifinal 1)
- Judges: Gao Xiaosong; Zhou Libo; Annie Yi
- Winner: Liu Wei
- Runner-up: Zhang Fengxi

Release
- Original network: DragonTV
- Original release: 25 July – 10 October 2010

Series chronology
- Next → Series 2

The first series of China's Got Talent, also known as Head & Shoulders China's Got Talent for sponsor reasons, premiered on DragonTV on July 25, 2010. The premiere ratings drew 400 million viewers. Dongfang Daily reported that with an 8 percent audience share in Shanghai while in 26 other provinces got a 1.37 percent share. The second episode increased 100 million viewers from the premiere which makes it 500 million viewers who watched. This makes China's Got Talent the most viewers in the Got Talent franchise history.

== Auditions ==
The auditions for the first series of China's Got Talent were pre-selected by the producers of the show from preliminary auditions. The auditions were held in Shanghai Concert Hall from July 25 to September 5. In China's version of Got Talent franchise, judges pressing 'X' does not always mean that they do not like the contestant's performance. It is a way to stop the performance as judges has heard enough and are satisfied.

Audition 1 (July 25, 2010)

Advanced

- Song Xinyu, Pianist/Singer (age 4) [5:15]
- Jiang Zhenwei, Elvis Impersonator (age 28) [7:40]
- Wen Wen, bellydancing act (age 20) [10:34]
- Kuang Biru, Singer (age 94) [11:36]
- Liu Junfeng, Opera tenor (age 26) [14:09]
- Yang Yun'ge, Crossdresser/Singer (age 25) [19:08]
- Wenkexin Bellydancing Group, Balancing/Bellydancing Group Act (ages 23) [22:38]
- Shenzhen Migrant Workers Hip-Hop Group, Dance troupe (ages 21–23) [25:34]
- Balancing Sticks Hip-hop Group, Hip hop Dance on Balancing Sticks (ages 24) [30:27]
- Gao Jiaming, One-man band (age 59) [30:49]
- Wang Yuxing, Michael Jackson impersonator (age 5) [30:40]
- Chen Mingliang, Tube musician (age 58) [31:02]
- Liu Dongli, singer (age 47) [31:06]
- Thursday, band (ages 22) [31:10]
- Bai Dengchun, cards slicing (age 22) (as in Audition 3) [31:15]
- Zhu Jie, Singer (age 23, Height: 4'2) [34:55]
- Li Hongqin, Bian Lian and Clothes Change (age 66) [41:05]
- Chen Jing, Singing and Somersaulting (age 29) [46:10]
- Zhu Xiaoming, Singer (age 20) [49:02]

Rejected

- Yue Longping, Singing in a Chicken suit (age 62) [4:00]
- Ning Xiaoer, Bellydancing in a Jack of Cards suit (age 22) (also in audition 5) [10:34]
- Rong Jun, Gymnastic/Ribbon act (age 19) [11:00]
- Huang Yiwei, Drummer (age 16) [11:13]
- Gao Feng, Michael Jackson impersonator (age 25) [31:31]

Audition 2 (August 1, 2010)

Advanced

- Zou Ran and Zou Chun, Singing/dancing (ages 5– 5 1/2) [4:25]
- "Doudou" Hong Bo, ventriloquist (age 38) [8:36]
- Li Xiangyin, folk migrant singer (age 65) [12:29]
- Old Buddies, band (ages 41–52) [25:29]
- A BOMB, singing group, (ages 19) [29:24]
- Jiang Renrui, Peacock Dance (a tribute to his sick wife) (age 45) [31:42]
- Hip-hop Group, Street hip-hop Dancers (ages 5) [38:18]
- Liu Shijie, Magician (age 30) [41:54]
- Chen Chutian, Upside down hulla-hoop Act (age 30) [42:27]
- Bronze Men, Thousand-Hand Golden Men dance (ages 37) [42:41]
- BABY STAR, Dance Troupe (ages 5) [42:59]
- Yang Di, Lip-synching Act (age 24) [43:23]
- Ashicai and Axiang, Lisu singers (age 25-46) [44:43]
- Shou Junchao, rapper (age 24) [48:08]
- Xu Hongdong, self-taught opera singer (age 31) [52:43]

Rejected

- "Terra Cotta Soldier" Cheng Chi-chang, Taiwanese, Tied to a stick act (age 38) [2:34]
- Zhang Dong, Big Mouth Act, (age 29) [11:16]
- Sun Chaoyang, Mouth Balancing Act, (age 25) [11:31]
- Luo Yan, Dancing with the Snake/Swallowing the Snake, (age 33) [11:54]
- Ma Haiming, Pianist/Singer, (age 21) [15:51]
- Bellydancing group, spider dance, (ages 37) [19:35]
- Yao Min, Michael Jackson impersonator, (age 26) [21:03]

Audition 3 (August 8, 2010)

Advanced

- Bai Dengchun, cards slicing (age 25) (clips broadcast in Audition 1) [13:15]
- Dennis, male pole dancer (from Uzbekistan) (age 25) [16:48]
- D-ancers Generation, dancers (ages 21) [22:25]
- Wang Cong and Li Wenbo, impressionists (ages 22) [28:32]
- Qian Chen, dance troupe (ages 18) [31:55]
- Fan Yuancheng, beat boxer (age 17) [32:24]
- Zhang Zhenghui, pumping air by nose, (age 55) [34:04]
- Zhou Yanfeng (Note: He got a second chance by providing his wife the stage for her singing skills which makes his wife the contestant while himself is eliminated from the competition.), pig act, (age 35) [36:05]
- Lu Tong, yodeling, (age 23) [43:50]
- Shao Meiling, magician, (age 25) [47:46]
- Power, acrobats, (ages 22) [50:48]
- Eastern Production, Ninja and Bunnies Act, (ages 23) [56:29]
- Liu Wei, disabled pianist, (age 23) [59:04]

Rejected

- TOP ONE, Three Ostrich Act, (ages 18) [9:51]
- ECNU Cheerleaders, Cheerleading troupe, (ages 23) [11:56]
- Liu Yunji, jumping rope, (age 50) [12:12]
- Wang Yanlong, muay thai, (ages 22) [12:23]
- Zhao Yingqiu, chopping stones with hand, (ages 31) [12:32]
- Zhang Jiaqi, eyebrow act, (age 6) [32:42]
- Ge Wang, snapping fingers, (age 25) [33:01]
- Xiong Bingsen, variety act, (age 19) [33:15]
- Wang Yongsheng, screamer, (age 30) [33:41]
- Gong Yucong, singer, (age 6) [55:04]
- Shen Ma, ball room dancers, (ages 63) [55:30]
- Yin Mengni, dog act, (age 20) [56:11]
- Mao Rongrong, Singing/balancing, (age 33) [56:48]

Audition 4 (August 22, 2010) (Note: This episode was originally scheduled to air on Aug 15th but was delayed due to National Mourning Day in China.)

Advanced

- Xu Mingfei and Zhang Zhengbang, Robot Clowns Act, (ages 24) [3:00]
- Cai Xiuqing, singer, (ages 23) [5:26]
- Modern Grannies, bellydancing troupe, (ages 41–62) [12:17]
- "Funeral Singer" Zhao Xinyu, singer, (age 8) [17:22]
- Parkour Team, parkour group, (ages 23) [22:33]
- Jiang Ping and Chen Yuxi, beatboxing duo, (age 23) [22:52]
- Team Jin Dong, martial arts group, (ages 22) [23:10]
- Nan Weidong, blowing glass bottles act, (age 42) [23:29]
- Yao Jinxiu, singer, (age 63) [23:54]
- Gao Yifeng, singer, (age 49) [30:05]
- Jin Yu, break dancer, (age 24) [37:10]
- Liu Xiaoyu and "Baimaonv" the dog, dog act, (ages 2–48) [39:40]
- Zhou Jinsong, singer, (age 46) [43:03]
- Zhai Xiaowei and Ma Li, disabled gymnasts, (ages 25–33) [44:55]
- Candy Wine, band, (ages 17) [49:56]

Rejected

- Zhang Keyuan and Three Little Kittens, singing and dancing, (ages 5–8) [27:44]
- Sun Weiwen and Hemadina, Yi people and Miao people respectively, rock and folk singers, (ages 23) [41:38]
- Dong Hai, bellydancing and singing act, (ages 24) [42:00]
- Zhang Weili, opera singer, (age 22) [42:23]
- Fu Fandi, singer, (age 36) [42:38]

Audition 5 (August 29, 2010)

Advanced

- Zhou Guozhong, bodybuilder (age 72) [4:15]
- Zhang Fengxi, stand up comedian, Zhou Libo impersonator (age 6) [8:05]
- Chubby Group, dance troupe (weighs 125 kg, 160 kg and 225 kg) [16:08]
- Dong Dun, American Indian dance and bellydancing act (age 26) [24:56]
- Chuan Zi and "Dudu" the dog, singing and dog howling act (ages 42 and 11) [28:20]
- Xiao Hua, strength act (age 55) [34:28]
- Cheng Xianping, circling dance act (age 45) [40:40]
- Chen Kaifei, singer (age 28) [44:49]
- Li Qiucheng, Cross-dressing Act (age 60) [48:33]

Rejected

- Ning Xiaoer, Bellydancing in a Jack of Cards suit (age 22) (also in audition 1) [2:17]
- Jia Jie, Singing and doing Nunchucks (age 63) [20:23]
- Early Morning, band (ages 5–7) [37:27]

Audition 6 (September 5, 2010)

Advanced

- Lü Xiaosheng, Sun Wukong magician (age 37) [9:55]
- Li Jun, pop music and peking opera singer (age 56) [16:54]
- Tibetan Blinds, Tibetan Blind singing group (ages 10–13) [25:28]
- Wang Liming, One Man Band (age 52) [29:48]
- Zhong Chenle, Catssinger (age 9) [32:54]
- Yue Xiang, Down syndrome patient wushu act (age 27) [40:19]
- Zhang Aiqing and Zhang Jianfa, dance duo (age 7-51) [46:51]
- Lan Ge, Zhuang male feminine singer (age 31) [55:01]

Rejected

- Aiya Maya, Shediao related dancing and singing (ages 7) [11:52]
- Ding Zhaohai, Strength Act (age 43) [35:51]
- Qin Aiqun, The White Haired Girl singer (age 58) [50:41]

== Semifinals ==
The semifinals began on September 12, 2010.

=== Rules ===
A media jury are involved. After jury's vote are all counted, each of three judges has a chance of giving 10 votes to one contestant. The contestant who gets the most votes advances to the final. Another final contestant will be decided between 2nd and 3rd place by judge's choice.

Two most popular contestants eliminated in semifinals can advance via online ballots after all 3 semifinals are broadcast.

Therefore, the final chart will be filled with two winners from each semifinal and two popular contestants.

Key	Judges' choice	Advanced to the finals.	Finished in either second or third place; Won the judges' vote.	Finished in either second or third place; Lost the judges' vote.	Advanced via popular vote.

=== Week 1 (September 12, 2010) ===
Order	Performer	Act Description	Jury's Votes (of 60)	Judges' Choices		
Order	Performer	Act Description	Jury's Votes (of 60)	Gao	Yi	Zhou
1	Shenzhen Migrant Workers Hip-Hop Group	Hip Hop Dance troupe	35	—	—	—
2	Chuan Zi and "Dudu" the dog	Singing and Dog Howling Act	34+10 (Zhou)	—	—	
3	Shou Junchao	Rapper	57+10 (Yi)	—		—
4	Zhu Jie	Singer	42	—	—	—
5	Dennis	Male Pole Dancer	38	—	—	—
6	Chen Jing	Singer and Strength Act	10	—	—	—
7	Zou Ran and Zou Chun	Singing/dancing	21	—	—	—
8	Liu Wei	Disabled pianist	58+10 (Gao)		—	—

=== Week 2 (September 19, 2010) ===
Order	Performer	Act Description	Jury's Votes (of 70)	Judges' Choices		
Order	Performer	Act Description	Jury's Votes (of 70)	Gao	Yi	Zhou
1	Modern Grannies	Bellydancing troupe	50	—	—	—
2	Cai Xiuqing	Singer	64+10 (Zhou)	—	—	
3	Zhang Aiqing and Zhang Jianfa	Dancing Duo	57	—	—	—
4	Power	Acrobats	32	—	—	—
5	Xu Mingfei and Zhang Zhengbang	Robot Clowns Act	42+20 (Gao and Yi)			—
6	Jiang Renrui	Peacock dance	24	—	—	—
7	Yang Di	Lip-synching and Dancing Act	31	—	—	—
8	Xu Hongdong	Opera singer	27	—	—	—

=== Week 3 (September 26, 2010) ===
Order	Performer	Act Description	Jury's Votes (of 70)	Judges' Choices		
Order	Performer	Act Description	Jury's Votes (of 70)	Gao	Yi	Zhou
1	Old Buddies	Band	43	—	—	—
2	Zhang Fengxi	Shanghainese stand up comedian	49+10 (Gao)		—	—
3	Zhu Xiaoming	Singer	55+20 (Yi and Zhou)	—		
4	Wenkexin Bellydancing Group	Bellydancing	3	—	—	—
5	Gao Yifeng	Singer	32	—	—	—
6	Zhai Xiaowei and Ma Li	Disabled Acrobats	62	—	—	—
7	Zhou Jinsong	Singer	27	—	—	—
8	Xu Na and Zhou Yanfeng	Singing and Performing	29	—	—	—

=== Popular Vote ===
Voting starts on September 27 and ends on October 3. Among 18 contestants eliminated in Semifinals, two can advance to the Final via popular votes.

Rank	Performer	Semifinal (Week)	Total Votes
1	Zhang Fengxi	3	219994
2	Modern Grannies	2	215320
3	Gao Yifeng	3	213771
4	Zhang Aiqing and Zhang Jianfa	2	209997
5	Zhou Jinsong	3	209891
6	Yang Di	2	191654
7	Power	2	188876
8	Xu Hongdong	2	183489
9	Old Buddies	3	160098
10	Dennis	1	155673
11	Zou Ran and Zou Chun	1	147738
12	Jiang Renrui	2	145438
13	Zhu Jie	1	118761
14	Wenkexin Bellydancing Group	3	98730
15	Chuan Zi and "Dudu" the dog	1	90836
16	Shenzhen Migrant Workers Hip-Hop Group	1	70052
17	Chen Jing	1	61298
18	Xu Na and Zhou Yanfeng	3	59089

== Final ==
Final was broadcast on 10 October and Liu Wei was the winner. Also a finale concert including Britain's Got Talent's contestants: Paul Potts, Escala, Diversity, and Signature and America's Got Talent contestant Recycled Percussion.

Final standing was decided by SMS votes started from 4 Oct and ended with the live broadcast. However, details about total votes or percentages have not been released yet.

Key	Winner	Runner-Up	Third Place

Order	SMS Voting Code	Finished	Artist	Act
1	8286	8th	Modern Grannies	Bellydancing troupe
2	8284	2nd	Zhang Fengxi	Shanghainese stand up comedian
3	8288	3rd	Cai Xiuqing	Singer
4	8281	4th	Zhai Xiaowei and Ma Li	Disabled Acrobats
5	8285	5th	Shou Junchao	Rapper
6	8283	6th	Zhu Xiaoming	Singer
7	8287	7th	Xu Mingfei and Zhang Zhengbang	Robot Clowns Act
8	8282	1st	Liu Wei	Disabled pianist

== Series 1 Round Summary (Top 24) ==
Italics indicate the act was selected by the online public voting as their top 2 favorites.

Key	Winner	Runner-up	Finalist	Eliminated

Name/Name of Act	Age(s)	Genre	Act	Hometown	Semifinal (Week)	Position Reached
Liu Wei	23	Performing	Disabled pianist	Huangpu, Shanghai	1	Winner
Zhang Fengxi	6	Comedic act	Shanghainese stand up comedian	Huangpu, Shanghai	3	Runner-up
Cai Xiuqing	23	Singing	Singer	Guangzhou, Guangdong	2	3rd place
Modern Grannies	41-62	Dancing	Bellydancing troupe	Wuhan, Hubei	2	Final
Shou Junchao	24	Singing	Rapper	Huangpu, Shanghai	1	Final
Xu Mingfei and Zhang Zhengbang	24	Dancing	Robot Clowns Act	Chengdu, Sichuan	2	Final
Zhai Xiaowei and Ma Li	25-33	Performing	Disabled Acrobats	Zhengzhou, Henan	3	4th place
Zhu Xiaoming	20	Singing	Singer	Huangpu, Shanghai	3	Final
Chen Jing	29	Singing and Performing	Singer and Strength Act	Huangpu, Shanghai	1	Semifinal
Chuan Zi and "Dudu" the dog	11-42	Singing and Performing	Singing and Dog Howling Act	Dongcheng, Beijing	1	Lost Judges' Choice, Semifinal
Dennis	25	Performing	Male Pole Dancer	Uzbekistan	1	Semifinal
Gao Yifeng	49	Singing	Singer	Hefei, Anhui	3	Semifinal
Jiang Renrui	45	Performing	Peacock dance	Hulunbuir, Inner Mongolia	2	Semifinal
Old Buddies	41-52	Singing	Band	Dongcheng, Beijing	3	Semifinal
Power	22	Performing	Acrobats	Cangzhou, Hebei	2	Semifinal
Shenzhen Migrant Workers Hip-Hop Group	21-23	Dancing	Hip Hop Dance troupe	Shenzhen, Guangdong	1	Semifinal
Wenkexin Bellydancing Group	23	Dancing	Balancing/Bellydancing Group Act	Beijing	3	Semifinal
Xu Hongdong	31	Singing	Opera singer	Lu'an, Anhui	2	Semifinal
Yang Di	24	Performing	Lip-synching Act	Ngawa, Sichuan	2	Semifinal
Zhang Aiqing and Zhang Jianfa	7-51	Dancing	Dance Duo	Huangpu, Shanghai	2	Lost Judges' Choice, Semifinal
Zhou Jinsong	46	Singing	Singer	Dongcheng, Beijing	3	Semifinal
Zhou Yanfeng and his wife Xu Na	35	Singing	Singer	Huangpu, Shanghai	3	Semifinal
Zhu Jie	23	Singing	Singer	Xicheng, Beijing	1	Semifinal
Zou Ran and Zou Chun	5	Singing	Singer and Dancing	Hunan	1	Semifinal

Preceded by None	China's Got Talent series 1 (2010)	Succeeded by series 2 (2011)
