= Brilliant Chinese =

Chinese television series

Brilliant Chinese is the spin-off from the popular series Dragon TV's China's Got Talent. It premiered on 2 February 2014 on CCTV1 and it is hosted by Sa Beining and Shu Dong.

The judges of the series in season 1 were Li Lianjie, Zhou Libo (also a judge in season 2) and Cai Ming. The judges in season two were Chinese film director Chen Kaige, actress Fan Bingbing, Cai Guoqing and Zhou Libo. In the next season, season 3, the judges will be Zhu Dan, Sa Beining and Huang Doudou.

The winner in season 1 was Feng Mantian, who is a 50-year old lute player. Season two was won by a group called Huanghe Ernv, a Chinese dance group from the United States of America.
