= China's Got Talent =

Chinese television series

- Chinese: 中国达人秀; Zhōngguó Dárén Xiù
- Created by: Simon Cowell
- Directed by: Jin Lei
- Presented by: Cheng Lei
- Judges: Zhou Libo; Annie Yi; Gao Xiaosong; Jerry Huang; Dou Wentao; Xu Jinglei; Leon Lai Ming; Yang Wei; Vicki Zhao Wei; Liu Ye; Alec Su; Wang Weichung)
- Country of origin: China
- No. of seasons: 6

Production
- Producers: FremantleMedia; Shanghai Media Group; Radio and TV Shanghai; Syco
- Running time: 90 minutes (auditions-semifinals); 277 mins (finals)

Original release
- Network: Dragon TV
- Release: 25 July 2010

Related
- Got Talent franchise

China's Got Talent
- Simplified Chinese: 中国达人秀
- Traditional Chinese: 中國達人秀
Transcriptions
Standard Mandarin
- Hanyu Pinyin: Zhōngguó Dárén Xiù

China's Got Talent (Chinese: 中国达人秀; lit. 'China's Talent Show') is a Chinese reality television series on Dragon TV and a part of the Got Talent franchise, hosted by Cheng Lei. It is a talent show that features all different kinds of performances of all ages competing for performing contract with FremantleMedia and Sony Music Entertainment. The show is a joint production between FremantleMedia, Shanghai Media Group, Radio and TV Shanghai and Syco.

On January 17, 2011, DragonTV announced that series 2 of the show has been launched. DragonTV also announced that there will be two series of the show in 2011.

== Selection process ==
=== Pre-auditions ===
Before the auditions in front of the judges were held, there were separate untelevised producers' auditions which come to various provinces across China, some which host the auditions held in malls, outside and inside small stages before July 19 until July 22 This round occurs several months before the judges' audition in Shanghai that also hosts the televised second round. Acts that have made it through the producers' audition will then audition in front of the judges and a live audience. For series 3, the pre-auditions were televised for the first time.

=== Audition process ===
The auditions take place in front of the judges and a live audience at Shanghai Concert Hall. At any time during the audition, the judges may show disapproval to the act by pressing a buzzer which lights a large red X on the stage. If all the judges press their buzzers, the act must end immediately. However, pressing X does not mean they dislike the performances or act. It is a way to stop the performance as the judges had heard enough because China's Got Talent lacks the 90 seconds rule. Voting works on a best-of-three basis for series one through three. For series four, voting is based on best of four.

== Series 1 (2010) ==
The first auditions began on 25 July 2010. Here, the winner has the chance to perform at Las Vegas for three months and be invited on Taiwanese pop singer Jolin Tsai's Myself World Tour as a guest performer. The judges were Zhou Libo, a Shanghainese stand-up comedian; Annie Yi, a Taiwanese singer and actress; Gao Xiaosong, a Chinese pop composer. They made up the jury panel for the final rounds of China's Got Talent. Series 1 ended on October 10, with the winner being a disabled pianist named Liu Wei.

Zhang Fengxi has become popular for Chinese speakers outside, mainly due to her use of Chinese puns, unique delivery and deadpan humor in her acts written by her parents. Judge Zhou Libo joked with the audience that she will succeed him. Another contestant who went onto greater things was Zhong Chenle. In 2016, he debuted in the K-Pop group NCT, as part of the sub-unit NCT Dream. He was also in NCT 2018. In the group, Zhong serves as lead vocalist and has maintained his singing capabilities.

According to China's Got Talent director Jin Lei, popular contestants from the show, including the season 1 winner armless pianist Liu Wei – performed in Austria, Italy, and France in January 2017.

== Series 2 (2011) ==
The second series began on May 1, 2011, but Gao Xiaosong was pulled over of drunk driving eight days later on May 9. He was replaced by Taiwanese music composer Antonio Chen for a brief stint in the audition but Jerry Huang was named temporary judge for the competition. On July 10, a popper, Zhuo Jun was named the winner. The runner up is Cai Hongping, a 55-year-old opera singer who changes the lyrics of popular pieces to be about the vegetables she sells.

== Series 3 (2011–12) ==
Series 3 began with a pre-show with especial guests such as finalist of the second season like Tian Ma and international artist like Daniela Anahí Bessia among others. The auditions premiered on November 20, 2011. It is the first time that the show televise the pre-audition process and top 14 selection process. The winner is Pan Qianqian, a female baritone singer.

== Series 4 (2012–13) ==
Series 4 premiere on November 18, 2012. In this series, there were four judges instead of three. Series regular judges Jerry Huang, Gao Xiaosong, Annie Yi. New judges introduced were Dou Wentao, Xu Jinglei, Leon Lai, and Yang Wei. Contortionist, Wang Jungru beat out yo-yo specialist, Duan Zhimin in this series.

== Series 5 (2013–14) ==
Series 5 premiered on December 8, 2013. The judges were Zhao Wei, Alec Su, Liu Ye, and Wang Weichung.

== Talent is... Coming and Talent's Night ==
These series started airing before the start of Series 2 and 4. The show was used to recap previous series' winners and notable contestants before a new series broadcast. It also featured new performances from previous series.

== Series summary ==
Series	Start	Finish	Winner	Runner-up	Host(s)	Other host(s)	Judges	Guest judges	Sponsor
1	July 25, 2010	October 10, 2010	Liu Wei	Zhang Fengxi	Cheng Lei	Cao Kefan (Semifinals 1)	Gao Xiaosong; Zhou Libo; Annie Yi Nengjing	—N/a	Head & Shoulders
2	May 1, 2011	July 10, 2011	Zhuo Jun	Cai Hongping	Cheng Lei	Yang Lan (Finals)	Gao Xiaosong (Until Audition 3); Zhou Libo; Annie Yi Nengjing	Jerry Huang Shu-chun (Audition 4–8, Finals); Yang Lan (Semifinals); Antonio Chen Yao-chuan (Audition 3)	Head & Shoulders
3	November 13, 2011	January 22, 2012	Pan Qianqian	Song Jiazheng	Cheng Lei	—N/a	Jerry Huang Shu-chun; Zhou Libo (Auditions, Semifinals); Annie Yi Nengjing (Some auditions, Finals)	Gao Xiaosong (Some auditions, Finals); Cui Yongyuan (Semifinals); Liu Wei (auditions); Ni Ping (auditions)	Head & Shoulders
4	November 18, 2012	January 27, 2013	Wang Jungru	Duan Zhimin	Cheng Lei	—N/a	Jerry Huang; Gao Xiaosong; Annie Yi Nengjing; Dou Wentao; Xu Jinglei; Leon Lai Ming; Yang Wei	Ying Da (some auditions); Huang Doudou (audition 6-8)	Head & Shoulders
5	December 8, 2013	February 23, 2014	Yin Zhonghua	Professor Liu	Cheng Lei	—N/a	Zhao Wei; Liu Ye; Alec Su; Wang Wei-chung	—N/a	Škoda Auto
6	11 August 2019	20 October 2019	Shi Zheyuan	Huajiaban (Hua's Academy)	Cheng Lei	—N/a	Yang Mi; Jin Xing; Shen Teng; Cai Guoqing	Yue Yunpeng (Takes place of Jin Xing when she is out)	Haitian Group
