= Liu Wei =

Liu Wei may refer to:

- Liu Wei (Jin dynasty), Jin and Later Zhao official
- Liu Wei (born 1957) (Chinese: 刘伟; pinyin: Liú Wěi, born 1957), Chinese economist
- Liu Wei (born 1958) (Chinese: 刘伟; pinyin: Liú Wěi, born 1958), Chinese politician
- Liu Wei (born 1965) (Chinese: 刘伟; pinyin: Liú Wěi, born 1965), Chinese politician
- Liu Wei (businessman, born 1969) (Chinese: 刘维, born 1969), executed Chinese crime boss
- Liu Wei (artist) (Chinese: 刘韡; pinyin: Liú Wěi, born 1972), Chinese artist
- Liu Wei (pianist) (Chinese: 刘伟; pinyin: Liú Wěi, born 1987), Chinese amputee pianist
- Liu Wei (businessman, born 1987) (Chinese: 刘伟; pinyin: Liú Wěi, born 1987), Chinese video game producer, co-founder and president of miHoYo

== Sportspeople ==
- Liu Wei (cyclist) (Chinese: 刘威; pinyin: Liú Wēi, born 1967), Chinese cyclist
- Liu Wei (table tennis) (Chinese: 刘伟; pinyin: Liú Wěi, born 1969), Chinese table tennis player
- Liu Wei (basketball) (Chinese: 刘炜; pinyin: Liú Wěi, born 1980), Chinese basketball player
- Liu Wei (curler) (Chinese: 刘微; pinyin: Liú Wēi, born 1984), Chinese wheelchair curler
- Liu Wei (boxer) (Chinese: 刘伟; pinyin: Liú Wěi, born 1987), Chinese boxer
- Liu Wei (footballer) (Chinese: 刘伟; pinyin: Liú Wěi, born 1993), Chinese footballer
