= China's Got Talent series 5 =

China's Got Talent
- Series 5
- Hosted by: Cheng Lei
- Judges: Zhao Wei; Alec Su; Liu Ye; Wang Wei-chung

Release
- Original network: DragonTV
- Original release: December 8, 2013 – February 23, 2014

Series chronology
- ← Previous; Series 4

The fifth series of China's Got Talent, sponsored by Škoda Auto, premiered on DragonTV on December 8, 2013. Judges were Zhao Wei, Alec Su, Liu Ye and Wang Wei-chung.

Preceded by series 4 (2012-2013)	China's Got Talent series 5 (2013-2014)	Succeeded by series 6 (2019)
