= Chinese Dream Show =

2011 Chinese reality talent TV show

- 中国梦想秀; Zhōngguó Mèngxiǎng Xiù
- Genre: Reality
- Created by: Zhou Libo
- Presented by: Zhu Yali(Current); Chen Huan(Current); Zhu Dan(Seasons 1-3); Li Han(Seasons 3-4); Hua Shao(Seasons 1-3)
- Starring: Zhou Libo(Season 3 - present); Zhao Zhongxiang(Season 6 Ep.1 - 3); Guo Jingming(Season 6, Unknown right now); Niu Qun(Season 6 Ep.4 - Unknown)
- Country of origin: China
- Original language: Chinese
- No. of seasons: 6
- No. of episodes: 67(up to November 22, 2013)

Production
- Production locations: Hangzhou, Zhejiang Province, China
- Running time: approx. 80 minutes

Original release
- Network: Zhejiang Satellite Television
- Release: April 2, 2011 – present

Chinese Dream Show (Chinese: 中国梦想秀; pinyin: Zhōngguó Mèngxiǎng Xiù) is a Chinese reality talent show that premiered on 2 April 2011 on the Zhejiang Television network. Program recording was done in Hangzhou. This show is now airing at 21:10(UTC+8) every Friday on Zhejiang Television network.

== Format ==
=== Seasons 1 and 2 ===
Seasons 1 and 2 were the same as the BBC television show Tonight's the Night. Season 1 was a segment of Zhejiang Television's previous variety show, "快乐蓝天下" (Under the Happy Blue Sky).

=== Season 3 ===
Season 3 used a different format from the first two seasons.

In Season 3, there were 300 people (called "梦想观察团" in Chinese, the "Dream Mission") sitting behind Zhou Libo, who was called the "梦想大使" (the "Dream Ambassador"). After the contestant or the "Dreamer" (called "追梦人") finished his or her performance, Zhou would chat with him or her. Finally, the audience would vote for or against his or her dream. If more than two-thirds (or 200 votes) of the audience voted for the Dreamer, he or she would proceed to the next show (Episodes 10 and 11, and the end of episodes 7 to 9 this season).

In Episodes 10 and 11, the Dreamers had to perform their second show to the audience. Then the same things as the former episodes would occur. Finally, if more than 80 percent (240 votes) of the audience voted for the Dreamer's dream, the contestant would be given a chance to realize his or her dream.

During the show, if someone was phased out or the host Zhou Libo did not agree with the result, he had a chance to use the "Reversal". If the Reversal was used, the contestant's result would be automatically changed.

=== Season 4 ===
Season 4 was very similar to Season 3. But if the contestant's family came to the studio with the contestant, the family would watch the contestant perform in a separate room with co-host Chen Huan. They would be shown on a large monitor in the beginning of the show, when Zhou Libo pressed the button on his left-hand side.

In Episode 10 and 11, the Dreamers must receive no less than 90 percent (270 votes) of the audience's votes to realize their dream.

=== Season 5 and 6 ===
In Seasons 5 and 6, before the voting began, the "Dream Assistants" ("梦想助力团", such as celebrities, famous companies, and charity groups) took their offers to the Dreamer, and the offers would be guaranteed when 240 votes are received.

In Season 6 which is premiered on October 11, 2013, the Reversal right is divided into three persons - Zhao Zhongxiang(in Episode 4 which is aired on November 1, 2013, Niu Qun, a Chinese comedian, replaced Zhao's state), Guo Jingming and Zhou Libo, the rule is adapted from the "Steal" rules of The Voice of China.

But in later episodes of Season 6, the guests are removed. <3

== Scandals & Controversies ==
=== Data Fraud ===
In the Episode 4 of Season 4, a contestant named Wu Xiaolei claimed that he was a forklift driver during the show. But later on Sina Weibo, which is a Chinese social networking like Twitter, a netizen said that there was a data fraud. The netizens were proven right. Wu had filled in a false identity on his registration form, so his opportunity to realize his dream was deprived in late November, 2012.

=== A failure to achieve the dream? ===
In the end of Season 3, Li Yan and Man Lingling, a couple from Changchun, Jilin Province, won the show, which is called winning "the Most Popular Dreamer". Their dream was opening a restaurant selling their home-made noodles. But in the autumn that year, someone in Sina Weibo found out the couple failed to open their dreaming restaurant, just taking performances instead.

On November 21, 2012, the couple said that the CN¥ 315,000 start-up capital was already in place. While they got back to their hometown, they found out that the rental agreement was cancelled. Finally, they decided to open the restaurant in Xiasha, a place in Hangzhou near the studio of the show.

=== The hostess got angry with Zhou Libo? ===
There were online reports saying that Zhu Yali, the show's current hostess, discorded with Zhou Libo. On October 17, 2013, Zhou Libo said to the media that "There is no difficulty in the ratings." And Zhu added, "If I had not come across such a partner like Zhou, then it would be the host's misfortune!"
