= Dime Que Si =

2020 single by Daniela Bessia

Single by Daniela Anahí Bessia
- Language: Spanish
- English title: Tell Me Yes
- Released: January 14, 2020
- Recorded: 2019
- Genre: Pop
- Length: 3:10
- Songwriter: Daniela Anahí Bessia
- Producers: Daniela Anahí Bessia, Andy Santana Bass

Daniela Anahí Bessia singles chronology
"I'm Here" (2017)	"Dime Que Si" (2020)	"Lo Que Mas Deseo"

"Dime Que Si" is a song recorded by the Italo-Argentinian singer Daniela Anahí Bessia. It was written by Bessia, and recorded, mixed and mastered by Andy Santana Bass. The song was released on 14 February 2020. Musically, "Dime Que Si" is a contemporary pop song about love composed by Bessia when she was 12 years old. The song contains lyrics that refer to true love as unstoppable.

The song was released with a professional music video (plus the teaser & the behind scenes) directed by the well-known director Gabriel Grieco with an international crew, filmed in two countries.

"Dime Que Si" received positive feedback from listeners, reaching more than 30,000 views on the Vevo channel with the full support of international sponsors from China, Argentina, Korea, etc. The song's accompanying music video was directed by Gabriel Grieco. In it, Daniela plays the piano making that the magic of the music brings her love from the other side of the world.

== Credits ==
- Music and lyrics: Bessia
- Musical director, music arrangements, recording, mastering: Andy Santana Bass
- Music production: Bessia
- Video director: Gabriel Grieco
- Actors: Bessia, Gabriel Grieco
- Photography, camera, and steady cam operator: Mario Gray
- First assistant director: Natalie Amberg
- Second unit director, line producer, cam operator: Catherine Boró
- Production: Bessia & Victoria Armayor
- Behind the Scenes: Charlie Tonelli
- Make up Artist: Seviltai
- Translations and Crew Assistant: Patricia Cao, Jeresa Gao Li
- Sponsors: Argentinian Consulate in Shanghai, Galleria Shanghai 格乐利雅(中国)艺术中心, La Grace, Top Zio, Artiz Studio, Futuro意弗(上海)钢琴有限公司, Casanova Shanghai, 一个音乐梦想(One Music Dream), Combo Studio.
- Special Thanks to Andy Santana Bass on double bass, Rael Solis on violin, Felix Ventouras, The Gardel Trio, Erika J. Cardona G., Dmitrii Gavriliak, Natalia Maksimenki, Browne Bear, Maoxiong Wu, Ana Cardona, Natalia Cardona, Paola Molina, Joye Yeung.

== Locations ==
The full track was recorded in Shanghai by Andy Santana Bass and the music video locations were in Buenos Aires, Argentina, and Shanghai, China, showing characteristics places such as the Obelisco de Buenos Aires and the Bund in Shanghai.
