= Mr. Zhou Live Show =

- Presented by: Zhou Libo
- Country of origin: China
- Original language: Chinese

Production
- Running time: 45 minutes

Original release
- Network: Phoenix TV/Dragon TV (2010–2012); Zhejiang TV (2012–present)
- Release: February 14, 2010

Mr. Zhou Live Show (Chinese: 壹周立波秀) is a Chinese television live talk show hosted by stand-up comedian Zhou Libo. It was originally broadcast by Phoenix Television and Dragon Television in 2010 and by Zhejiang Television after 2012.

Like his stand-up, Zhou does not have scripts or notes, creating his own material through improvisation. The show also includes guest interviews and Zhou dropped his Shanghai dialect to have a more accessible audience.
