= Daniela Anahí Bessia =

Argentinean-born singer (born 1989)

Daniela Bessia
- Born: 9 July 1989 (age 37); Buenos Aires, Argentina
- Other name: 安达 Ān Dá
- Occupations: TV, advertisement, bands, concerts and tours, performance, recording
- Known for: China Central Television artist
- Notable work: "Dime Que Si"; China's Got Talent
- Style: Pop, easy listening
- Television: CCTV, Shanghai TV, Hunan TV, Beijing TV
- Awards: Best International Performance at CCTV, Chinese Bridge
- Honours: Shanghai Excellence Expat
- Musical career
- Also known as: BDaniela
- Origin: Italy
- Website: www.danielabessia.com

Daniela Anahí Bessia
- Simplified Chinese: 安达
- Traditional Chinese: 安達
Transcriptions
Standard Mandarin
- Hanyu Pinyin: Ān-Dá

Daniela Anahi Bessia (Chinese: 安达; pinyin: Ān-Dá, born 9 July 1989) is an Italian-Argentine singer, actress, song composer, and TV host.

She has been based in Shanghai, China since 2011 and moved to Italy in 2020.

She is best known for her performances on China Central Television and is the award winner of the top ten "Shanghai Excellence Awards," awarded to expats who have made contributions to the city with more than 12 million online votes.

The international press has called Bessia "The Extraordinary Expat", for her contributions to the local cultural scene, and tells about Bessia's passionate and inspiring performances, which have entertained viewers and brought a deeper understanding of Argentine culture to Chinese people.

== Career ==
In 2011, she went to Shanghai. In Argentina, she appeared at many events, notably the China Ambassador Museum celebration. She received a full scholarship to study Chinese language and culture.

== Filmography ==
Television
Year	Title	Role	Notes	Channel
2011	China's Got Talent	Herself 安达	For China's Got Talent (series 3) as a Guest singing Mo Li Hua	Dragon Television
2015	Open Door (TV programme)	Herself 安达	Special Artist Guest participating and winner of 20000元	China Central Television
2015	Escuela de Sabores (美食训练营)	Host	Host for the Season 1, 2 and 3	CGTN Spanish
2018	Open Door (TV programme)	Herself	Artist Guest - Special Show singing 大中国	China Central Television
2018	My Best Friend (我的真朋友)	Sophie 苏菲	Episode: Recurring Role Chinese television drama Locations: China - Italy	Dragon Television and Streaming television

Documentaries
Year	Title	Role	Notes
2016	转动南半球	Lead - Host	Mitsubishi Motors Across Argentina (三菱汽车- 汽车之家)
2020	My Northern Shaanxi Tour in China	Lead - Host	China Central Television - CCTV Headquarters - CCTV-4

Music Videos
Year	Title	Role	Notes
2020	Dime Que Si	Lead	Compocer, actriz, producer

=== Television ===
She was invited to appear on Xianyan (China talent show). Afterwards, she appeared in Tonight Said Something and Oriental zhiboshi, among others. She was a special guest on Venus Mars Hit and on Shanghai Summer Charm and with the Shanghai Philharmonic orchestra. She appear on Jinshe Spring Festival Spring Festival Gala 2013 on Taiwan. She appeared on CCTV programs Gold 100 Seconds and Avenue of Stars (Xing Guang Da Dao).

==== Variety shows ====
- Gold 100 Seconds
- Snake Spring Festival Spring Festival Gala 2013

== Album ==
In March 2014, Bessia recorded an album, a collection of all the songs she sang in China.

== Discography ==
- 美食训练营 (2016)
