= Shi Jinmo =

Chinese traditional medicine expert

Shi Jinmo (Chinese: 施今墨; 28 March 1881 – 22 August 1969), former name Shi Yuqian (施毓黔), courtesy name Jiangsheng (奖生), was a practitioner of traditional Chinese medicine. He advocated the integration of traditional Chinese medicine into Western modern medicine.

== Early life ==
Shi's ancestral hometown was Kanshan Town, Xiaoshan, Zhejiang, and he was born in Guizhou Province. He was inspired to learn about healing due to his mother's chronic illness. In 1884, at age 13, Shi began learning Chinese medicine from his uncle Li Keting, who ran a well-known clinic in Anyang, Henan. He enrolled at the Shanxi Grand Academy (now Shanxi University) in 1902 but was expelled due to his dissent from the principal's campaign.

== Career ==
From 1903 to 1906, he studied at Shanxi Judicial and Political Academy. After graduation, he joined the Capital Judicial and Political Academy, while starting his medical practice. During that time, Shi actively supported Xinhai Revolution, and devoted to social welfare. In 1912, as a delegate from Shanxi, Shi attended the inauguration ceremony of the Temporary President of the Republic of China, Sun Yat-sen. Later, he assisted Huang Xing to draft the army's military law.

In 1930, he co-founded Beiping National Medical College along with Xiao Longwen and Kong Bohua; that school closed in 1944. Just two years after Beiping National Medical College had been founded, Shi had a disagreement with Kong about the school's direction, and left to establish the North China National Medical Academy. The Beijing School for the Further Education of Chinese National Practitioners (also called the "Beijing Chinese Medical Improvement School") was established on the site of the North China National Medical Academy in 1950.

Along with Wang Fengchun, Xiao Longyou, and Kong Bohua, Shi was known as one of the "Four Famous Doctors of Beijing" (北京四大名医), as they headed the Beijing Traditional Chinese Medicine Examination as chief examiners since 1935.

Shi advocated for TCM to become more rigorous and worked to standardize the names and diagnostic patterns used in TCM; he also worked to ground TCM practice and training in anatomy, physiology, pharmacology, and other basic sciences of medicine and implemented that in the curriculum of his schools.

Due to the ominous political atmosphere, Shi attained his belief that "if one can not be a good minister, be a good doctor", and thus concentrated on his medical practice. He broke one character in his name, Qian (黔), and adopted Jinmo (今墨) as his name, incarnating the spirit of "shared love" of Mozi and the medicinal canon of Mozi.

Shi was persecuted in Cultural Revolution. His health seriously deteriorated in spring 1969, and he died on 22 August in Beijing.

== Family ==
Shi financed his niece Lu Shijia's studies at the University of Göttingen in Germany under Ludwig Prandtl. Lu later became a renowned physicist who founded the aerodynamics program at Beihang University, the first in China.
