= Liu Wei (born 1957) =

Chinese economist

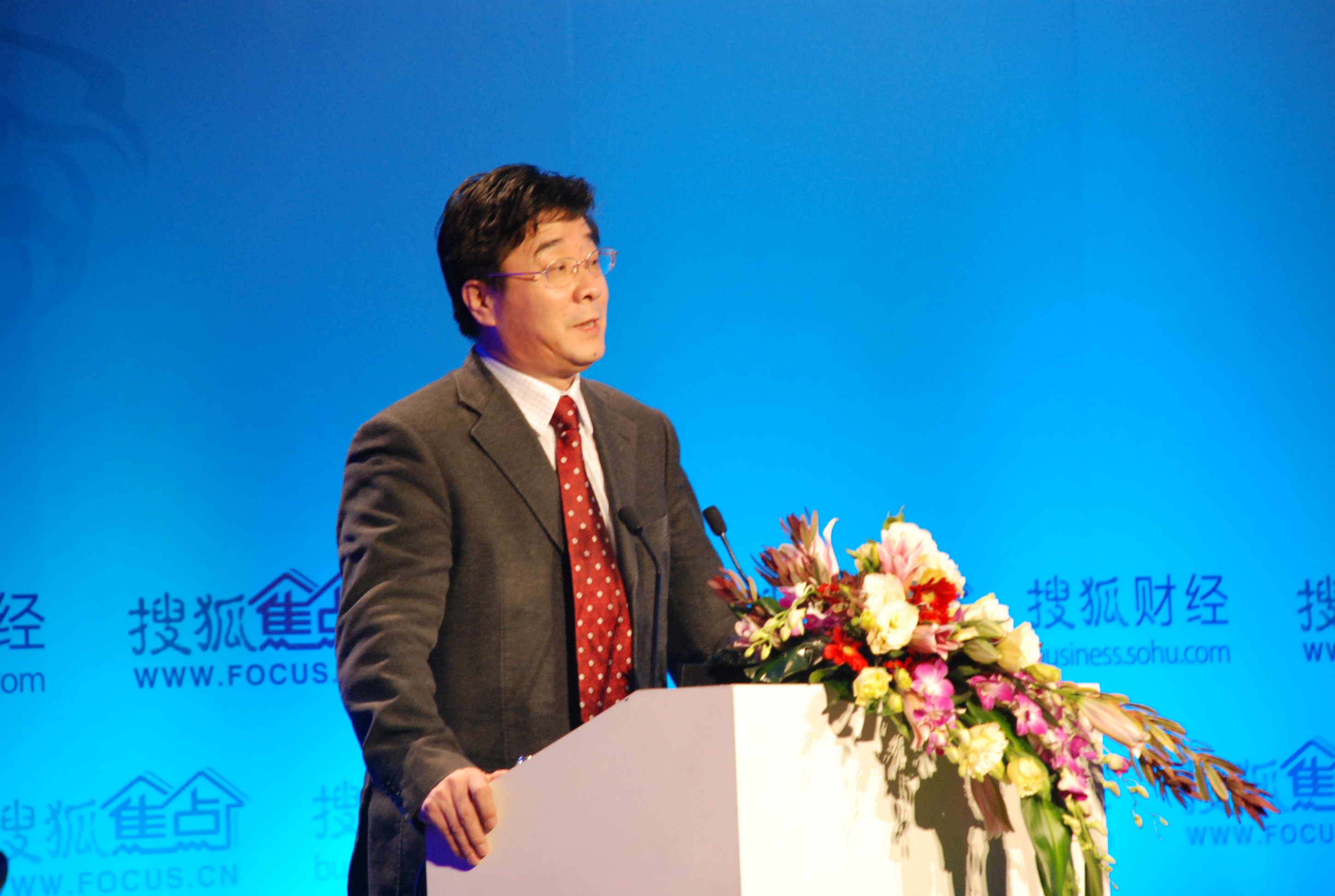
at the China Real Estate New Perspective Summit Forum on January 10, 2012.

Liu Wei (Chinese: 刘伟, born January 1957) is a Chinese economist, professor, and doctoral supervisor. Originally from Mengyin, Shandong, he was born in Shangqiu, Henan. He previously served as President and Deputy Party Secretary of Renmin University of China.

== Biography ==
Liu Wei graduated from Peking University with a bachelor's degree in economics in 1982 and earned a master's degree in economics from the same institution in 1984. He then joined the faculty, serving successively as lecturer, associate professor, and professor. In 1990, he obtained his doctoral degree in economics from Peking University. In 2006, he was named a distinguished professor of the Changjiang Scholars Program. He served as dean of the School of Economics at Peking University in 2002 and became assistant to the president in 2007. In May 2010, he was appointed vice president of Peking University, and in September 2013, he became executive vice president. In November 2015, he was promoted to president of Renmin University of China. In April 2017, he also took on the role of deputy party secretary of Renmin University.

In August 2022, he stepped down as president and deputy party secretary of Renmin University due to age-related reasons.

== Role ==
- Vice President, 7th Council of the Chinese Society of Higher Education
- Member, State Council of academic degree
- Deputy Director, Expert Committee on Disciplinary Development and Professional Programs, Ministry of Education
