= Jerry Huang =

Taiwanese actor and model

Jerry Huang Zhi Wei
- 黃志瑋
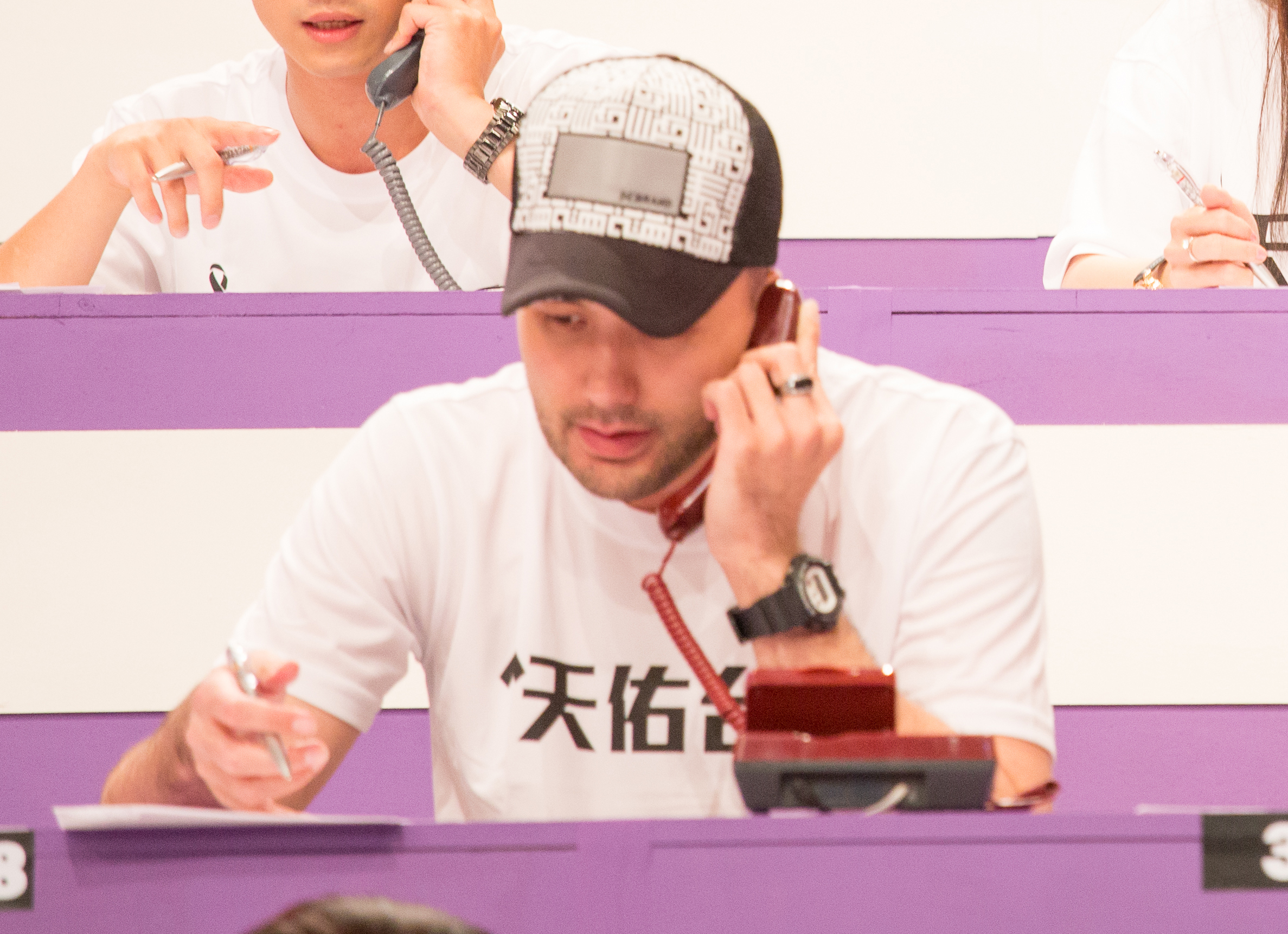
- Huang participating in a telethon after the 2014 Kaohsiung gas explosions
- Born: April 10, 1981 (age 44); Taipei, Taiwan
- Occupation: Actor/Model

Chinese name
- Traditional Chinese: 黃志瑋
- Simplified Chinese: 黄志玮
Transcriptions
Southern Min
- Hokkien POJ: N̂g Chì-úi

Jerry Huang or Huang Zhi-wei (Chinese: 黃志瑋; Pe̍h-ōe-jī: N̂g Chì-úi; born 10 April 1981) is a Taiwanese actor and model.

== Filmography ==
Year	Title	Role	Notes
2009	Invitation Only	Yang	Taiwanese Horror Movie
2009	My Fair Gentleman		Chinese Movie
2010	Common Heroes		Taiwanese Movie
2012	To My Dear Granny		Taiwanese Movie
2012	Star of Bethlehem		Taiwanese Movie
2013	The Regret	Zhang Yang	Taiwanese Movie
2013	As the Wind Blows		Taiwanese Movie
2019	49 Days		
2019	Special Treatment		
2024	Hero is Back	Huang Fu Long Dou	
2024	Love's Rebellion	Meng Xiao Lou	

== Television series ==
Year	Title	Role	Network
2003	The Rose	Han Jin	TTV
2004	You Light Up My Star		FTV
2004	101st Proposal		
2004	Endless Love		
2004	My Puppy Lover		
2004	I Love My Wife		
2008	Ying Ye 3 Jia 1	Fang Wei	TTV
2009	Meteor Shower	Yi Mian	CTV
2009	K.O.3an Guo	Yuan Shao	FTV
2009	Chinese Paladin 3	Cong Lou	CTV
2011	Ex-Boyfriend/Qian Nan You	Dai Yi-Hsiang	TTV Series
2011	In Time with You	Henry	FTV
2011	Thank you for Giving Me a Family		TTV Series
2013	True Love 365	Lai Tian Cheng	CTV
2014	Mr. Right Wanted	Fang Cheng Hao	TTV

== Awards ==
- 2002 China's New Silk Road Contest
