= Liu Wei (pianist) =

Chinese disabled pianist from Beijing (born 1987)

Liu Wei (Chinese: 刘伟; born October 7, 1987, in Beijing) is a Chinese disabled pianist from Beijing who won the first series of China's Got Talent at the age of 23 by playing the piano with his toes.

== The accident ==
Liu Wei lost his arms at the age of 10 after touching a high-voltage wire during a game of hide-and-seek. He regained consciousness after 45 days of critical condition. His parents told him he should learn how to eat by himself, otherwise no one could take care of him when they become old. His mother kept telling him that he is not different from the others. In the hospital, he met an armless painter, which inspired him to learn to use his feet to write, brush his teeth and eat.

At the time, he dreamed of becoming a soccer player. He was encouraged by Liu Jingshen, vice-chairman of the Beijing Disabled Persons' Federation, to do daily chores with his feet and started swimming two years later. He won two gold medals and one silver at the National Swimming Championship for the Disabled in 2002. He learned how to do other daily activities such as navigating online, eating, dressing and brushing his teeth. He considers himself more fortunate than those without enough to eat, debunking ideas of those who believe him unhappy.

== Becoming a musician ==
He started playing the piano at age of 18 or 19 (sources vary) to pursue his childhood dream of being a musician. His first teacher quit as he considered it impossible for someone to play with their toes. However, Liu, who was studying music theory, persisted and taught himself in secret how to play, despite cramps and abrasion, often practicing seven hours a day. As he said, the melodies he can play are limited due to the length of his toes and he cannot play certain pieces he loves because he cannot reach across octaves. Nevertheless, he aims to become such a good pianist that people won't notice that his arms are missing.

== Appearance in the talent show ==
In his first appearance, Liu received a standing ovation from the audience, many of whom were moved to tears, for a performance of "Mariage D'amour" by Richard Clayderman on August 8, 2010. The semifinal took place on September 12, and he played "You're Beautiful" in Shanghai Stadium at the final on October 10, accompanied by his singing. The jury panel of China's Got Talent, Shanghai stand-up comedian Zhou Libo, Taiwan singer-actress Annie Yi and mainland pop composer Gao Xiaosong, all praised Liu's performance.

As a prize for his achievement, Liu was invited by Taiwanese singer Jolin Tsai to be a guest act on her Myself World Tour in Shanghai, which would give him the chance to perform in Las Vegas for three months. In addition, he was likely to get a contract with Fremantle Media and Sony Music Entertainment, and his itinerary was to include Hong Kong, Paris, Vienna and Taipei.

In 2010, he won the Guinness World Record of typing the most letters alphabetically in 1 minute, using the feet: 251 letters.

== Quotes ==
(Source)

- "To me, there are three things can not be missed in life – air, water and music."
- "There are only two paths in my life for me – either to die as fast as possible, or to live as brilliant a life as I could."
- "I don't feel that I am that different from other people. Normally everyone is used to do everything with one's hands so your hands are more flexible. There is no rule saying that you can't do things with your feet."
- "A man should be responsible to his dreams. My dream is to become a great musician."
- "I know if I want to do it better than other people, I have to put in more efforts."
- On the note he wrote on the paper in this clip, it says: "Walk on, at least I have a pair of perfect legs."
