= Gao Xiaosong =

Chinese musician (born 1969)

- Born: November 14, 1969 (age 56)
- Origin: Beijing, China
- Genres: Folk rock, soft rock, pop
- Occupations: Film director, playwright, film producer, composer, songwriter, music producer
- Instrument: Guitar
- Years active: 1993—present

Gao Xiaosong (Chinese: 高晓松; born 14 November 1969) is a Chinese musician, talk show host, and film director. He rose to fame in the 1990s as a campus folk songwriter and later became a prominent entertainment executive and media personality. From 2015 to 2021, Gao served as Chairman of the Alibaba Entertainment Strategic Committee and AliMusic. In September 2021, he was blacklisted in China, with his talk shows removed from platforms, reportedly due to his "historical nihilism" and pro-Western views.

== Career ==
=== Music ===
- 1988 graduated from Beijing No.4 High School
- 1988 entered Department of Electronic Engineering, Tsinghua University, majoring in Radar
- 1991 Dropped out of Tsinghua University and attended the preparatory course for postgraduate study of film directing in Beijing Film Academy
- 1993 Released debut album Collegiate Ballads 1, which won almost all the pop music prizes that year. In the years that followed, worked as a composer of both music and lyrics, sometimes as producer.
- Set up Taihe Rye Music in 1996, the biggest music label in mainland China until Gao founded Evergrande Music in 2010
- Previous board member and music director of Evergrande Music
- 1999 Director and music composer of expressionist film Where Have All the Flowers Gone
- Has been the chairman of two national major music awards since 2011
- Produced "Silence" for Na Ying in 2015, which topped the music charts in China for two months
- Produced "Jasmine" for Celine Dion in 2013
- Produced "Alive" for Sa Dingding, which won the BBC Radio 3 World Music Award in 2008 and topped the iTunes world music download
- Wrote and produced song "Feng Qing Yang (Man with the wind)" for Alibaba founder Jack Ma and mandopop diva Faye Wong
- Was the main judge for more than 10 talent shows, such as China's Got Talent
- Was the chair of Alibaba Music Group from July 2015
- Was the chair of Alibaba Entertainment Strategic Committee from September 2016

=== Talk show host ===
Xiaosong Pedia: June 2014 – December 2016

- Xiaosong Pedia is a cultural talk show premiered on June 6, 2014, at iQiy. Produced by Gao Xiaosong studio under the iQiyi network, hosted by Gao Xiaosong.
- During August 2016, as the host of the talk show, Xiaosong accused a Canadian government-backed tourism organization of trying to censor Xiaosong Pedia.
- Xiaosong Pedia ended in December 2016. The show received more than 900m views during its two-and-a-half-year run.

Morning Call: March 2012 – June 2014

- The show has accumulated viewership of over 850 million, highest in the world; one episode has over 40 million hits

Today in History: January 2013 – December 2013

- A daily talk show with the highest viewership on Dragon TV, the scripts have been published in China.

=== Film director ===
- Serving as the Executive Producer for Netflix's science fiction series 3 Body Problem, which has been nominated for six Emmy Awards, including Outstanding Drama Series.
- Wrote, composed and produced his fifth feature film My Old Classmate, which obtained half of the national gross box office on its first day of release on Friday, April 25, 2014. The film topped the Chinese national box office for nine consecutive days and accumulated a box office of US$80 million.
- Directed and composed the music for his fourth feature film My Kingdom, produced by Andre Morgan (the producer of Million Dollar Baby, The Warlords); Action Director was Sammo Hung; released in September 2011 in China, USA (AMC), Australia, New Zealand, Hong Kong, Singapore, Malaysia, Indonesia, Vietnam, etc. The box office in China accumulated to US$10 million. The film was first runner-up on the box office chart for September 2011.
- Directed and composed the music for his third feature and first American film Fragile, This Side Up, Keep Dry in 2006, produced by Alain Siritzky and Jean Chalopin.
- Directed and composed the music for his second feature film Rainbow in 2002, starring Chen Daoming and Li Xiaolu.
- Directed and composed the music for his first feature film Where Have All the Flowers Gone in 1999, starring Zhou Xun (Best Actress Award, the 15th Paris Film Festival) and Xia Yu (Best Actor, Venice Film Festival 1994).

=== Writer ===
- Published Face on the Wall in 2000 and sold over 180,000 copies
- Published Like a Song in 2009 and sold over 500,000 copies
- Books to published in 2014 include two volumes of the scripts Morning Call and six volumes of Today in History

=== Charity ===
In 2015, Gao founded the nonprofit Zashuguan Library and has been its curator since then. The library has a collection of over 800,000 books and documents, the majority of which were published during the Ming and Qing dynasties and the Republic of China period.

== Personal life ==
Gao Xiaosong's father Gao Liren (born 1942) was a photographer and a professor at Tsinghua University. His mother Zhang Kequn, born 1942 in Berlin to physicists Zhang Wei and Lu Shijia, was an architect and a faculty member at Tsinghua University. She was also a grandniece of Shi Jinmo.

Gao married Shen Huan in 1999. They divorced in 2002. In 2007, he married Xu Canjin. The couple had a daughter. They divorced in 2013.

On May 9, 2011, Gao was arrested after being involved in a road traffic accident in Beijing. He was convicted of reckless driving and driving while drunk, and was sentenced to six months in prison. Gao afterwards spoke out against drunken driving, saying "When wine is in, wit is out. Please draw a lesson from my case."
