= Zhou Libo (comedian) =

Chinese stand-up comedian

- Chinese: 周立波; pinyin: Zhōu Lìbō
- Born: 22 April 1968 (age 58); Shanghai, China
- Spouse(s): Zhang Jie (1990-2009); Hu Jie (2010-present)

Comedy career
- Medium: Stand up, Television
- Genres: Observational comedy, Improvisational comedy, Political satire

Zhou Libo (Chinese: 周立波; pinyin: Zhōu Lìbō; born on April 22, 1967, in Shanghai) is a Chinese stand-up comedian, television actor and host. In addition to comedy, he has also been a judge on China's Got Talent. In late 2008, Zhou created his own stand-up comedy called "Shanghai Style Small Talk" (Chinese: 海派清口) which includes A Laughable Talk on the Past 30 Years and A Laughable Talk in Big Shanghai.

== Comedic style ==
His comedic style is based upon the Shanghainese style of comic dram, which is delivered in a linguistic mixture of Mandarin Chinese, Shanghainese and some English words and phrases. Zhou frequently discusses topics such as urban life, economic and political issues. Traditional comic dramas are included in his performances in which a pair of performers are engaged in conversation and only on occasion break the fourth wall. Shanghainese-style comedic performances tend to have only one performer speaking to the audience, a feature that is also found in modern Western stand up comedies, in contrast to the Chinese xiangsheng, which most of the time consists of a comic duo.

In "A Laughable Talk on the Past 30 Years," Zhou discussed the drastic changes in Shanghai since the reform and opening up, and his show also covers content such as the changes of clothing trends, ups and downs in the Chinese stock market, and the shoe-throwing incident during premier Wen Jiabao's visit to Cambridge University.

Zhou's material and delivery is entirely improvised when performing on stage due to ongoing and recent events so that the show is 'up-to-date' and keeps up with global events in which he may cover within his show.

On 12 March 2023, he criticized Russian president Vladimir Putin in a Weibo post and suggested that Chinese leader Xi Jinping's plan for "the great rejuvenation of the Chinese nation" include taking back territory handed over from the Qing dynasty to Russia, leading his account to get banned.

== Personal life ==
His parents originated from the Zhenhai district in the city of Ningbo located in Zhejiang province.

In the early hours of January 19, 2017, Zhou's black Mercedes was pulled over by police in Long Island, New York. Upon further inspection of the vehicle, police discovered a .38 ACP Colt Mustang pistol and two bags of crack cocaine in the back seat. Zhou was immediately detained.

== Discography ==
- Reincarnation (第二次投胎)
- A Laughable Talk in Big Shanghai (笑侃大上海)
- A Laughable Talk on the Past 30 Years (笑侃三十年)
- I'm Crazy About Money (我为财狂)

== Filmography ==
- Mr. Zhou Live Show
- China's Got Talent
- Chinese Dream Show
