= Annie Yi =

Taiwanese singer, actress, and writer

- 伊能靜
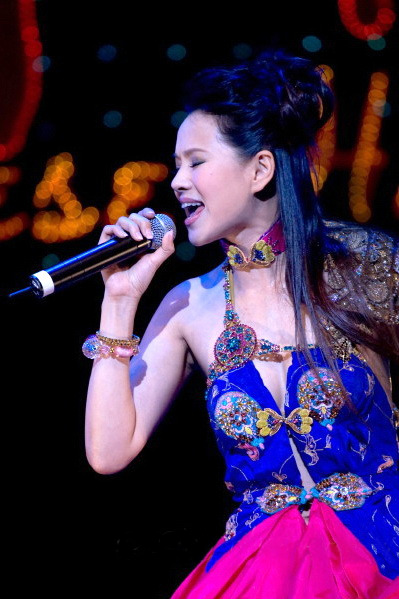
- Yi in 2007
- Born: Wu Chin-yi (吳靜怡); 4 March 1968 (age 58); Taipei, Taiwan
- Other name: Shizuka Inoh
- Occupations: Singer; Actress; Writer
- Years active: 1986–present
- Spouses: Harlem Yu (m. 2000; div. 2009) Qin Hao (m. 2015)
- Children: 2
- Musical career
- Also known as: Annie Shizuka Inoh
- Origin: Taipei, Taiwan
- Genres: Mandopop; Cantopop; J-pop
- Instrument: Vocals
- Spinoff of: Feiying Trio

Chinese stage name: Yi Neng-ching
- Traditional Chinese: 伊能靜
- Simplified Chinese: 伊能静
Transcriptions
Standard Mandarin
- Hanyu Pinyin: Yī Néngjìng
- Wade–Giles: Yi^{1} Neng^{2}-ching^{4}

Chinese legal name: Wu Chin-yi
- Traditional Chinese: 吳靜怡
- Simplified Chinese: 吴静怡
Transcriptions
Standard Mandarin
- Hanyu Pinyin: Wú Jìngyí
- Wade–Giles: Wu^{2} Ching^{4}-yi^{1}

Japanese name
- Kanji: 伊能 静江 / 伊能 静
- Hiragana: いのう しずか
- Katakana: イノウ シズカ
Transcriptions
- Romanization: Inō Shizuka

Wu Chin-yi (Chinese: 吳靜怡; pinyin: Wú Jìngyí; born 4 March 1968), professionally known as Annie Yi (Chinese: 伊能靜; pinyin: Yī Néngjìng) or Annie Shizuka Inoh (Japanese: 伊能 静, romanized: Inō Shizuka), is a Taiwanese singer, actress, and writer.

== Early life ==
Wu Chin-yi (Note: traditional Chinese: 吳靜怡; simplified Chinese: 吴静怡; pinyin: Wú Jìngyí; Wade–Giles: Wu^{2} Ching^{4}-yi^{1}) was born on March 4, 1968, in Taipei, Taiwan, the youngest of seven daughters of Yang Shu-wan (Note: traditional Chinese: 楊淑婉; simplified Chinese: 杨淑婉; pinyin: Yáng Shūwǎn; Wade–Giles: Yang^{2} Shu^{2}-wan^{3}) and Wu Min (Note: traditional Chinese: 吳敏; simplified Chinese: 吴敏; pinyin: Wú Mǐn; Wade–Giles: Wu^{2} Min^{3}). Her mother is from Keelung and her father is from Shandong. Her father divorced her mother to marry another woman who gave him a boy, her half-brother Wu Pu-hui (Note: traditional Chinese: 吳不悔; simplified Chinese: 吴不悔; pinyin: Wú Bùhuǐ; Wade–Giles: Wu^{2} Pu^{2}-hui^{3}; lit. 'no regrets').

During her childhood, she was sent to study in an English-language primary school at Hong Kong. Then, she moved to Japan to live with her mother and her step-father, Yoshimitsu Inoh (Note: Japanese: 伊能 祥光, romanized: Inō Yoshimitsu), a Japanese man from the Ryukyu Islands. She took her step-father's surname and took a Japanese name "Shizuka Inoh" (Note: Japanese: 伊能 静江, romanized: Inō Shizuka). She lived in Tokyo, Japan for six years and studied at Tokyo Chinese School.

== Career ==
At the age of 17, she returned to Taiwan from Japan and became a singer under Liu Wen-cheng’s Flying Eagle Production. She took the stage name "Yi Nengjing" (Note: traditional Chinese: 伊能靜; simplified Chinese: 伊能静; pinyin: Yī Néngjìng), by simplifying her Japanese name dropping the last character. She debuted alongside her labelmates Donna Chiu and Fang Wen-lin, becoming a popular teen idol in the late 1980s and 1990s, and also expanded her singing career to Hong Kong and Japan.

Since 1995, Yi successfully transitioned from music to film, working with Taiwanese director Hou Hsiao-hsien on three films, including her debut Good Men, Good Women (1995), followed by Goodbye South, Goodbye (1996), and a cameo in Flowers of Shanghai (1998). In 1999, Yi starred in 8 ½ Women, a film by British director Peter Greenaway. Yi is also a writer of both fiction and nonfiction, known for her self-help books on relationships.

Since the early 2000s, Yi shifted her career focus to mainland China. In addition to acting, she was a regular judge on talent shows, notably serving as a four-time judge from 2010 to 2013 on China's Got Talent. In 2020, Yi participated in the reality show Sisters Who Make Waves.

== Personal life ==
=== Relationships ===
On 14 February 2000, after a relationship of 14 years, Yi married Taiwanese singer Harlem Yu in the United States. They have a son Harrison Yu Enli (Chinese: 庾恩利; pinyin: Yǔ Ēnlì), originally named Yu Hanrui (Chinese: 庾翰睿; pinyin: Yǔ Hànruì), who was born on 16 March 2002 in the United States. On November 10, 2008, photos of Yi holding hands with Taiwanese actor Victor Huang during a date in Beijing were exposed, with further allegations that they had been having a three-year affair since co-starring in the TV series Concubines of Qing Emperor (2006), while Yi was married and Huang was in a relationship. In March 2009, Yi and Yu issued a divorce statement.

On 21 March 2015, Yi married Chinese actor Qin Hao in Phuket, Thailand. Yi gave birth to their daughter Cindy Qin (Note: Chinese: 秦伊皓; pinyin: Qín Yīhào) in 2016 in the United States.

=== Political views ===
In the early 2010s, Yi was actively engaged in public discussions on Weibo, such as in the 2011 Wenzhou train collision, cultivating a civic-minded, pro-democracy image, sometimes referred to as a public intellectual. However, her career was derailed due to her criticism of the Chinese government's censorship and her support for press freedom during the 2013 Southern Weekly incident, which resulted in a brief Weibo ban and a year-long TV ban. Since her return, Yi has shifted her public stance towards a pro-CCP and pro-unification position, which has sparked controversy in her native Taiwan. In 2024, she was invited to attend the reception celebrating the 75th anniversary of the founding of the People's Republic of China, held at the Great Hall of the People in Beijing.

=== Religion ===
In 2019, Yi raised controversy on Weibo for promoting the teachings of Indian godman Kalki Bhagwan, the founder of a spiritual organization Oneness. After the Chinese Ministry of Public Security (MPS) and China Anti-Cult Association (CACA) issued a warning about the Oneness cult's activities, she removed the related Weibo posts.

=== Adoption ===
On 25 September 2013, Yi announced that she adopted Xia Junfeng's son Xia Jianqiang (Note: Chinese: 夏健強; pinyin: Xià Jiànqiáng) as her godson and his wife Zhang Jing (Note: simplified Chinese: 张晶; traditional Chinese: 張晶; pinyin: Zhāng Jīng) as her blood sister.

== Filmography ==
=== Film ===
Year	English title	Original title	Role	Notes
1987	Naughty Cadets on Patrol	大頭兵出擊		
1989	Emergency Police Lady	霹靂警花	Yin Xiaojun	
1995	Good Men, Good Women	好男好女	Liang Ching	
1996	Goodbye South, Goodbye	南國再見，南國	Pretzel	
1997	Gun with Love	我血我情	Yingying	
1997	Wolves Cry Under the Moon	國道封閉	Jade	
1998	Flowers of Shanghai	海上花	Golden Flower	
1999	8½ Women		Simato	English-language film
2006	Fifteen-Minute Angel	天使一刻鐘	Yu Luoxin	TV film
2007	Call for Love	爱情呼叫转移	Liang Huijun	
2007	Crossed Lines	命运呼叫转移	Doctor Lü	Segment 4: "The Boy Who Cried Wolf" (山难)
2010	Secret Battleground	孤島秘密戰		
2010	Ancient Town Affection	古镇情缘	Ye Bei	
2010	Will Tomorrow Ever Come	明天是否来临	Xinming	
2011	Coming Back	回马枪	Min Yue	
2011	Perfect Baby	巴黎宝贝	Rose	
2011	My Kingdom	大武生	Xiaoyu	
2012	The Assassins	銅雀臺	Fu Shou	
2013	Better and Better	越来越好之村晚	Chief interviewer	
2013	The Palace	宮鎖沈香	Empress Xiaojingxian	
2013	Timeless Love	时光恋人	Zhong Ying	
2013	The Empire Symbol	帝国秘符	Ayako Ono	
2015	The Queens	我是女王	Melissa	also director, co-writer, and co-producer

=== TV series ===
Year	English title	Original title	Role	Notes
1991	The 700-Million Bride	七億新娘	Jiang Xujie	
1997	Portrait of a Fanatic	情在艰难岁月中	Fu Lu	
1998	Will You Still Love Me Tomorrow	明天有你	Tian Jingzi	
2000	April Rhapsody	人間四月天	Lu Xiaoman	
2000	The Voices Within	心灵物语	Su Huimin	
2001	Poor Prince	貧窮貴公子	Lingzi	
2001	Married Off to Japan	远嫁日本	Zhou Mingli	
2002	In Love	偷偷愛上你	Ni Chunchun	
2003	A Leaf in the Storm	風聲鶴唳	Zhang Wanxin	
2003	Painting Soul	畫魂	Xia Mengying	
2005	Lovelorn High Heels	失戀高跟鞋	Zhang Ning	
2006	The Life and Death Love	生死绝恋	Yang Yinghong	
2006	Concubines of the Qing Emperor	大清後宮	Consort Xiang	
2007	Sad Songs of the Qinhuai River	秦淮悲歌	Liu Rushi	
2008	The Spirit of the Sword	浣花洗劍錄	Princess Tuochen	
2008	The Long River East Flows	長河東流	Yuniang	
2009	Love Tribulations	鎖清秋	Li Yue'e	
2009	Fuego	狼烟	Lu Peipei	
2009	The Young Lawyer Ji Xiaolan	少年訟師紀曉嵐	Wu Shishi	
2009	Three Women's Secret	三个女人的秘密	Wang Ding	
2009	Great Porcelain Merchant	大瓷商	Wei Qiuhe	

=== Television show(s) ===
Year	English title	Original title	Role	Notes
2020	Sisters Who Make Waves	乘风破浪的姐姐	Cast member	
