= Shanghai Concert Hall =

Concert hall in Shanghai, China

Coordinates: 31°13′44.06″N 121°28′22.40″E

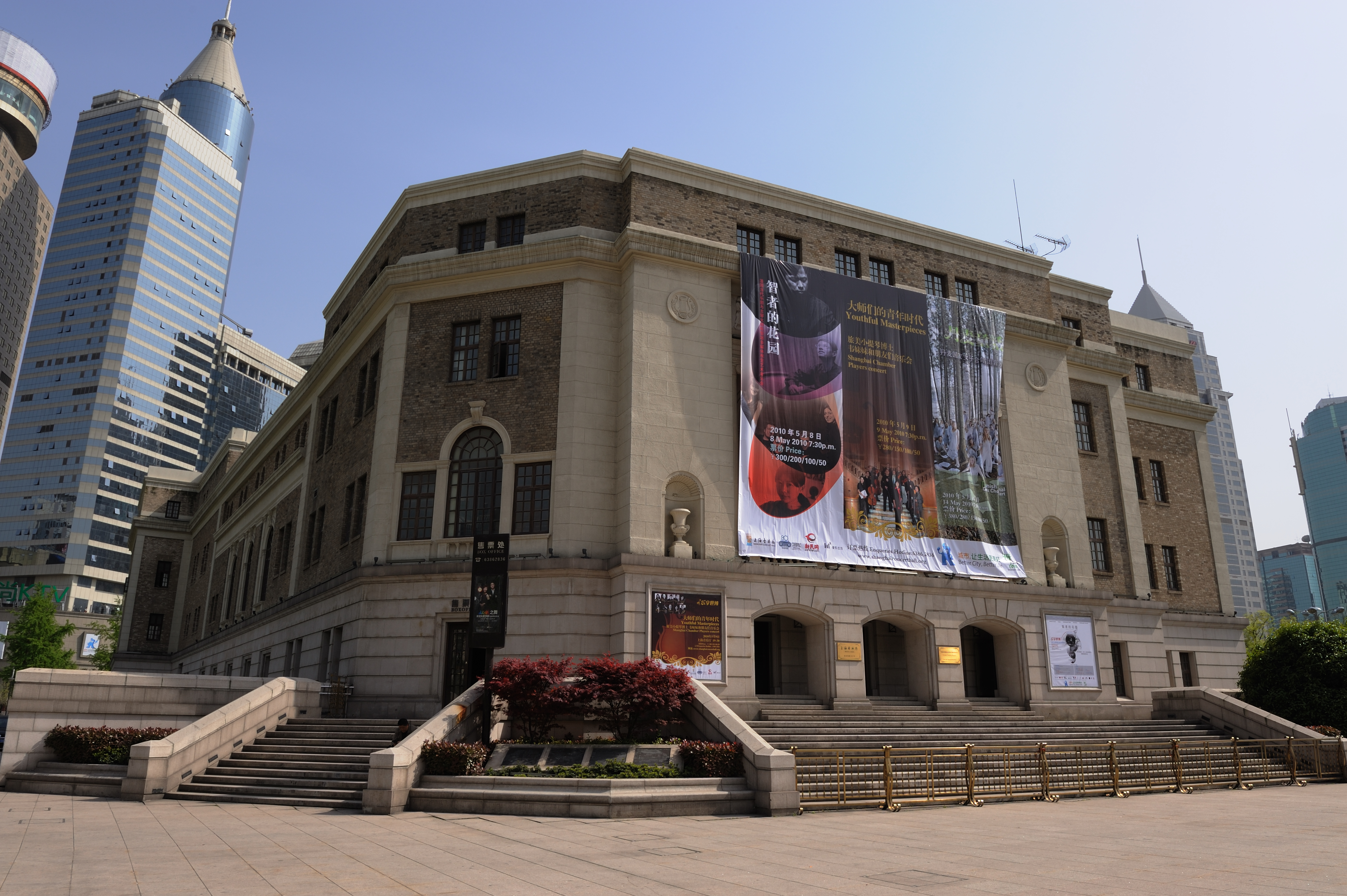
- Traditional Chinese: 凱迪拉克·上海音樂廳
- Simplified Chinese: 凯迪拉克·上海音乐厅
Transcriptions
Standard Mandarin
- Hanyu Pinyin: Shànghǎi Yīnyuè Tīng

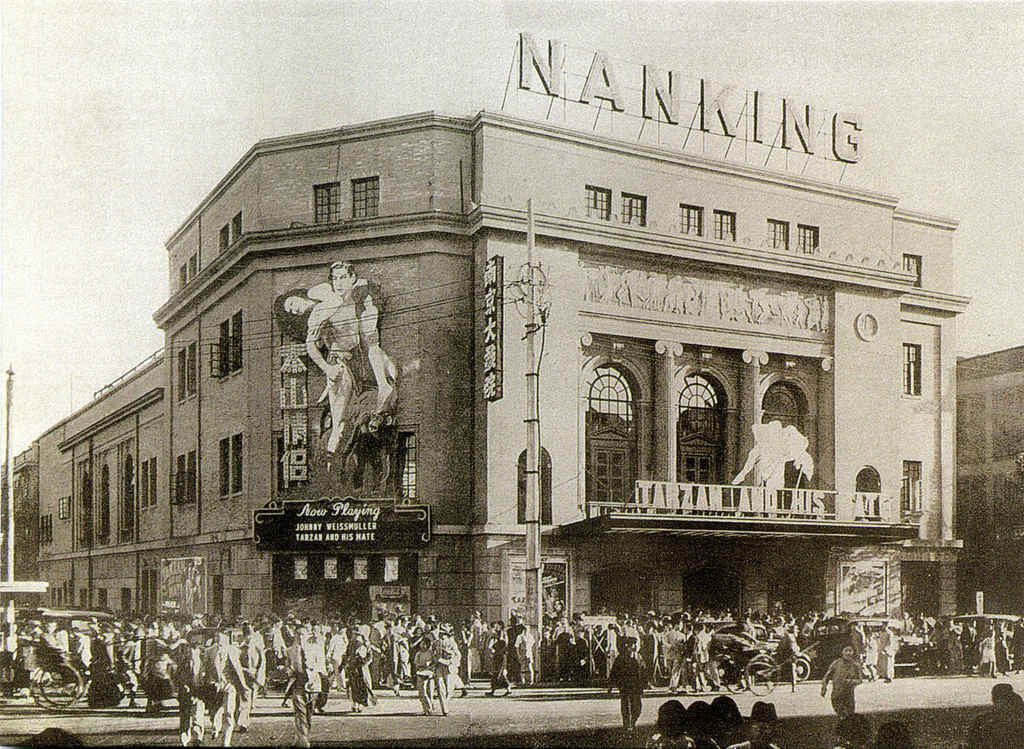
Nanking Theatre in 1934, showing Tarzan and His Mate

Cadillac·Shanghai Concert Hall is located on the intersection of Yan'an Road and South Tibet Road of Huangpu District, Shanghai. It was founded in 1930 as Nanking Theatre. In 1949, its name was changed to Beijing Cinema. In 1959, it was renamed Shanghai Concert Hall.

The hall can accommodate 1,122 seats, 640 on the ground floor and 482 on the second floor. The stage is 8.35 metres by 16 metres, covering around 100 sq. metres.

The Concert Hall was designed by Chinese architect Fan Wenzhao (范文照) in European style.

In order to make way for Yan'an Elevated Road, the hall was relocated in 2007. The project embarked at 10 am on April 15, and cost 50 million RMB. The 5,800 ton concert hall was first lifted 1.7 meters, moved east 66.4 meters, and finally lifted another 1.7 meters at the new site, using Enerpac hydraulic cylinders. The project concluded on January 1, 2008. The Shanghai Concert Hall reopened on September 26, 2008.
