= The Ellen DeGeneres Show season 9 =

The Ellen DeGeneres Show
- Season 9
- Starring: Ellen DeGeneres
- No. of episodes: 171

Release
- Original release: September 12, 2011 – May 30, 2012

Season chronology
- ← Previous; Season 8 Next → Season 10

This is a list of episodes of the ninth season of The Ellen DeGeneres Show, which aired from September 12, 2011 to May 30, 2012.

== Episodes ==
No. overall	No. in season	Original release date	Guests
1,354	1	September 12, 2011	Season 9 Premiere - Ashton Kutcher, Bubble Guppies (San Antonio TX Show)
1,355	2	September 13, 2011	David Arquette, Sidewinder, Taylor Swift
1,356	3	September 14, 2011	Jon Cryer, Chaz Bono New Girl
1,357	4	September 15, 2011	Eva Longoria, Greyson Chance, Cast of Go Diego Go
1,358	5	September 16, 2011	David Beckham, Lady Antebellum, Maya Rudolph
1,359	6	September 19, 2011	Ellen's Live Emmy Show Mike & Molly, Modern Family
1,360	7	September 20, 2011	Demi Lovato, Kathy Bates, Christina Applegate
1,361	8	September 21, 2011	Joseph Gordon-Levitt & Seth Rogen, Bryce Dallas Howard & Anna Kendrick, Maroon 5
1,362	9	September 22, 2011	Brad Pitt, Chris Pratt, Kelly Clarkson Dr Phil
1,363	10	September 23, 2011	Jamie Foxx, Elisabetta Canalis & Valentin Chmerkovskiy, Dr. Drew Lady Gaga
1,364	11	September 26, 2011	Wanda Sykes, Joe Jonas, Julianne Hough & Kenny Wormald
1,365	12	September 27, 2011	Jennifer Garner, Cody Simpson, Kevin Dillon
1,366	13	September 28, 2011	Simon Cowell, Paula Abdul, Nicole Scherzinger, L.A. Reid, Steve Jones, Luke Bryan
1,367	14	September 29, 2011	Heidi Klum, Nancy Pelosi, LeAnn Rimes
1,368	15	September 30, 2011	David Spade, Bethenny Frankel
1,369	16	October 3, 2011	Breast Cancer Awareness Month Judge Judy, Dr Oz
1,370	17	October 4, 2011	Kellie Pickler, Joel McHale
1,371	18	October 5, 2011	Kim Kardashian & Kris Humphries, Angus T. Jones
1,372	19	October 6, 2011	Zooey Deschanel, New Girl Ricki Lake & Derek Hough
1,373	20	October 7, 2011	Alyson Hannigan, Scotty McCreery, Blake Mycoskie
1,374	21	October 10, 2011	Steve Martin, Jack Black & Owen Wilson, Christina Grimmie
1,375	22	October 11, 2011	Liza Minnelli, Keith Urban
1,376	23	October 12, 2011	Glen Campbell, Ellen Pompeo
1,377	24	October 13, 2011	Kaley Cuoco, Adam Scott, Lupe Fiasco
1,378	25	October 14, 2011	Jesse Tyler Ferguson, Michael Strahan
1,379	26	October 17, 2011	Hilary Duff, J.R. Martinez, Karina Smirnoff, Logan Lerman
1,380	27	October 18, 2011	Martin Sheen &Emilio Estevez, Connie Britton, Philip Galanes
1,381	28	October 19, 2011	Taylor Swift, Abigail Breslin, Foster the People, Diary of a Wimpy Kid
1,382	29	October 20, 2011	Steve Harvey, Rachel Maddow, Robyn
1,383	30	October 21, 2011	Marcia Cross, Lauren Alaina
1,384	31	October 24, 2011	Harry Connick Jr & Kate Connick, Sean Hayes, Rob Kardashian & Cheryl Burke
1,385	32	October 25, 2011	LL Cool J, Jonah Hill, Jason Derulo, Mehmet Oz
1,386	33	October 26, 2011	Will Arnett, Anton Yelchin & Felicity Jones, Lady Antebellum
1,387	34	October 27, 2011	Justin Timberlake, Coldplay Bobs Burgers
1,388	35	October 28, 2011	Michele Williams, Ariel Winter, Kevin Nealon
1,389	36	October 31, 2011	The Halloween Show!, Lady Gaga, Dr Phil
1,390	37	November 1, 2011	Justin Bieber, Principal Sherrie Gahn
1,391	38	November 2, 2011	Glen Campbell, Ellen Pompeo
1,392	39	November 3, 2011	Eddie Murphy, Coldplay Bradley Steven Perry
1,393	40	November 4, 2011	Antonio Banderas, Johnny Galecki
1,394	41	November 4, 2011	Kate Walsh, Freida Pinto
1,395	42	November 8, 2011	Sophia Grace & Rosie, Kirsten Dunst
1,396	43	November 9, 2011	Taye Diggs, Jermaine Jackson, Kermit the Frog
1,397	44	November 10, 2011	Melissa McCarthy, Armie Hammer, Luke Bryan
1,398	45	November 11, 2011	Katy Perry
1,399	46	November 14, 2011	Lauren Graham, Josh Vietti
1,400	47	November 15, 2011	Amy Adams
1,401	48	November 16, 2011	Dylan McDermott, Miranda Lambert, Lil' P-Nut
1,402	49	November 17, 2011	Robin Williams, Selena Gomez & the Scene
1,403	50	November 18, 2011	Robert Pattinson, Kristen Stewart, Taylor Lautner & Kellan Lutz, Ashley Greene, Nikki Reed, Jackson Rathbone, Peter Facinelli & Elizabeth Reaser, Bruno Mars Adele Glee
1,404	51	November 21, 2011	Rihanna, Drew & Brittany Brees, Steve Spangler
1,405	52	November 22, 2011	Tim Allen, Mark Kelly, Daughtry
1,406	53	November 23, 2011	Sofia Vergara, Adam Levine, Gym Class Heroes
1,407	54	November 25, 2011	Felicity Huffman, Cirque du Soleil: Iris
1,408	55	November 28, 2011	Minnie Driver, Sarah Hyland Glee
1,409	56	November 29, 2011	Alison Sweeney, Usher, David Guetta
1,410	57	November 30, 2011	Stevie Wonder, Kristin Chenoweth, Kym Douglas
1,411	58	December 1, 2011	Day #1 of 12 Days of Giveaways - Vince and Shea Vaughn, Bono, Shailene Woodley, She & Him
1,412	59	December 2, 2011	Day #2 of 12 Days of Giveaways - Sting, Russell Brand
1,413	60	December 5, 2011	Day #3 of 12 Days of Giveaways -Josh Duhamel, Laura Dern
1,414	61	December 6, 2011	Day #4 of 12 Days of Giveaways - Hilary Swank, Steve Jones, Sabrina Sato
1,415	62	December 7, 2011	Day #5 of 12 Days of Giveaways - Katherine Heigl, Lenny Kravitz
1,416	63	December 8, 2011	Day #6 of 12 Days of Giveaways -Pierce Brosnan, Bethenny Frankel
1,417	64	December 9, 2011	Day #7 of 12 Days of Giveaways - Lady Gaga
1,418	65	December 12, 2011	Day #8 of 12 Days of Giveaways - Allison Janney, Maggie Elizabeth Jones
1,419	66	December 13, 2011	Day #09 of 12 Days of Giveways - Diane Keaton
1,420	67	December 14, 2011	Day #10 of 12 Days of Giveaways - Charlize Theron, Kevin Nealon, Christina Perri
1,421	68	December 15, 2011	Day #11 of 12 Days of Giveaways - Paris Jackson
1,422	69	December 16, 2011	Day #12 of 12 Days of Giveaways - Amy Poehler
1,423	70	January 3, 2012	Howie Mandel, Elle Fanning
1,424	71	January 4, 2012	Dennis Quaid, Justin Bieber, Mindless Behavior
1,425	72	January 5, 2012	Jersey Shore Cast
1,426	73	January 6, 2012	Kirstie Alley, Jordyn Wieber
1,427	74	January 9, 2012	Kelly Osbourne, Shervin Lalezary, Nolan Gould, Gavin DeGraw
1,428	75	January 10, 2012	Woody Harrelson, Joshua Jackson, The Wanted
1,429	76	January 11, 2012	James Spader, Jeremy Irvine, Daniel Simons & Jonah Lehrer
1,430	77	January 12, 2012	Meryl Streep, Ricky Gervais, Snow Patrol
1,431	78	January 13, 2012	Queen Latifah, Kenneth Branagh
1,432	79	January 16, 2012	Sofia Vergara, Big Time Rush
1,433	80	January 17, 2012	Steven Tyler, Timothy Olyphant, Chris Young
1,434	81	January 18, 2012	Colin Firth, Jeremy Irvine, Uggie the dog, Colbie Caillat
1,435	82	January 19, 2012	Rob Lowe, Adam Lambert
1,436	83	January 20, 2012	Kiefer Sutherland, Kevin Nealon
1,437	84	January 23, 2012	Shemar Moore, Kym Douglas
1,438	85	January 24, 2012	Sam Worthington, Michael Strahan, Seal
1,439	86	January 25, 2012	Mario Lopez, Ben Flajnik
1,440	87	January 26, 2012	Jimmy Kimmel, Melissa McCarthy, Earth Wind & Fire
1,441	88	January 27, 2012	Ted Danson, Kellie Pickler, Christopher Plummer
1,442	89	January 30, 2012	John Krasinski, 2Cellos
1,443	90	January 31, 2012	Simon Baker, Kristen Bell
1,444	91	February 1, 2012	Drew Barrymore, Octavia Spencer, Flo Rida Lady Gaga, Modern Family
1,445	92	February 2, 2012	Michelle Obama, Daniel Radcliffe
1,446	93	February 3, 2012	Christina Aguilera, Adam Levine, Blake Shelton
1,447	94	February 6, 2012	Jim Parsons, Miley Cyrus
1,448	95	February 7, 2012	Martin Scorsese, Rachel McAdams
1,449	96	February 8, 2012	Julie Bowen, Josh Hutcherson, The Band Perry
1,450	97	February 9, 2012	Channing Tatum
1,451	98	February 10, 2012	Denzel Washington, Kat Dennings, LL Cool J
1,452	99	February 13, 2012	Jennifer Lopez, Marc Anthony, Jamie King
1,453	100	February 14, 2012	Kris Jenner, Bruce Jenner
1,454	101	February 15, 2012	Ellen Pompeo, Dierks Bentley
1,455	102	February 16, 2012	Sean “Diddy” Combs, 2012 Sports Illustrated Swimsuit cover model Kate Upton
1,456	103	February 17, 2012	Reese Witherspoon, Nathan Lane Team Umizoomi Wonder Pets Bubble Guppies
1,457	104	February 20, 2012	Amanda Seyfried
1,458	105	February 21, 2012	Taylor Swift, Zac Efron
1,459	106	February 22, 2012	Randy Jackson, Justin Theroux, Natasha Bedingfield
1,460	107	February 23, 2012	Jennifer Aniston, Cirque du Soleil's Juggling Ants
1,461	108	February 24, 2012	Seth Rogen, Bethenny Frankel
1,462	109	February 27, 2012	Meredith Vieira, Emily VanCamp
1,463	110	February 28, 2012	Kate Walsh
1,464	111	February 29, 2012	Cheryl Hines, Kacie Boguskie, Steve Spangler
1,465	112	March 1, 2012	Justin Bieber, Lauren Gray, Megan Mullally
1,466	113	March 2, 2012	Steve Harvey, Jason Mraz
1,467	114	March 5, 2012	Julianne Moore, Idina Menzel
1,468	115	March 6, 2012	Christian Slater, Lenny Kravitz
1,469	116	March 7, 2012	Jon Hamm, Michael Weatherly, Sara Bareilles
1,470	117	March 8, 2012	Megan Fox, Carson Daly, Justin Willman
1,471	118	March 9, 2012	David Arquette, Robin Thicke
1,472	119	March 12, 2012	Jason Segel, Jennifer Morrison, Cirque du Soleil's Ants
1,473	120	March 13, 2012	Jessica Simpson, Ellie Kemper, Dierks Bentley & the Punch Brothers
1,474	121	March 14, 2012	Jonah Hill, Chris Rene
1,475	122	March 15, 2012	Ewan McGregor, Drew Brees, Toby Keith
1,476	123	March 16, 2012	Amanda Peet
1,477	124	March 19, 2012	Ed Helms, Kathy Freston
1,478	125	March 20, 2012	Armie Hammer, Kevin Nealon, Birdy
1,479	126	March 21, 2012	Elizabeth Banks, Casey James
1,480	127	March 22, 2012	Kristin Chenoweth, K'Naan featuring Nelly Furtado
1,481	128	March 23, 2012	Julia Roberts, Liam Hemsworth, Justin Bieber, Carly Rae Jepsen
1,482	129	April 2, 2012	Colin Farrell, Seann William Scott, Lionel Richie
1,483	130	April 3, 2012	Andrew Garfield, Edie Falco, Mo Isom
1,484	131	April 4, 2012	Emma Stone, Kenny Chesney, Tim McGraw, Tim Salazar
1,485	132	April 5, 2012	Jennifer Love Hewitt, Rascal Flatts, Kym Douglas
1,486	133	April 6, 2012	Jason Biggs, Colbie Caillat, Common
1,487	134	April 9, 2012	Cee-Lo Green, Miranda Kerr, Chloe & Halle Bailey
1,488	135	April 10, 2012	Jane Lynch, Alison Sweeney, Bonnie Raitt
1,489	136	April 11, 2012	Khloe Kardashian Odom, Ellie Goulding
1,490	137	April 12, 2012	Maya Rudolph, Josh Bowman, Karmin
1,491	138	April 13, 2012	Sean Hayes, Gabrielle Union, Wayne Pacelle
1,492	139	April 16, 2012	Michelle Obama, Katharine McPhee, Neon Trees
1,493	140	April 17, 2012	Emily Blunt, Jason Mraz
1,494	141	April 18, 2012	Mariska Hargitay, Squeeze, Megan Hilty
1,495	142	April 19, 2012	Wanda Sykes, Bon Iver
1,496	143	April 20, 2012	Nicole Richie, Jennie Garth, Tom Shadyac
1,497	144	April 23, 2012	Sharon Osbourne, Maria Menounos & Derek Hough, Roberto Martin
1,498	145	April 24, 2012	Jesse Tyler Ferguson, Rita Wilson, Cory Booker, Grace Potter and the Nocturnals
1,499	146	April 25, 2012	Jack Black, Cobie Smulders
1,500	147	April 26, 2012	Adam Levine, Sophia Grace & Rosie
1,501	148	April 27, 2012	Hugh Grant
1,502	149	April 30, 2012	Diane Keaton, Donald Driver &Peta Murgatroyd
1,503	150	May 1, 2012	Jessica Alba, Scott Caan, Paul
1,504	151	May 2, 2012	Julianna Margulies, Kevin Nealon
1,505	152	May 3, 2012	Bill Clinton
1,506	153	May 4, 2012	Scarlett Johansson, Robert Downey Jr.
1,507	154	May 7, 2012	Eva Mendes, Beth Ostrosky Stern
1,508	155	May 8, 2012	Johnny Depp, Chloë Grace Moretz, Michelle Pfeiffer, Alison Sweeney, Flo Rida
1,509	156	May 9, 2012	Carrie Underwood, Anna Kendrick
1,510	157	May 10, 2012	Nicki Minaj
1,511	158	May 11, 2012	Hilary Duff, Nick Cannon, Molly Sims
1,512	159	May 14, 2012	Kate Beckinsale, Taylor Kitsch
1,513	160	May 15, 2012	Jennifer Lopez, Cameron Diaz, John Mayer, Victoria Justice
1,514	161	May 16, 2012	Steve Carell, Brooklyn Decker, Bobby Brown
1,515	162	May 17, 2012	Russell Brand
1,516	163	May 18, 2012	Ellen's 1500th show
1,517	164	May 21, 2012	Howie Mandel, Cat Deeley
1,518	165	May 22, 2012	Katy Perry, Alanis Morissette
1,519	166	May 23, 2012	Will Smith, Justin Bieber
1,520	167	May 24, 2012	Charlize Theron
1,521	168	May 25, 2012	Matt LeBlanc, Olivia Munn
1,522	169	May 28, 2012	Ellie Kemper, Rufus Wainwright
1,523	170	May 29, 2012	Vince Vaughn, Kat Graham, Bethenny Frankel
1,524	171	May 30, 2012	Vanessa Williams, Sarah Hyland
