= The Ellen DeGeneres Show season 4 =

The Ellen DeGeneres Show
- Season 4
- Starring: Ellen DeGeneres
- No. of episodes: 171

Release
- Original release: September 4, 2006 – May 30, 2007

Season chronology
- ← Previous; Season 3 Next → Season 5

This is a list of episodes of the fourth season of The Ellen DeGeneres Show, which aired from September 2006 to June 2007.

== Episodes ==
No. overall	No. in season	Original release date	Guests
517	1	September 4, 2006	Season Premiere Justin Timberlake, Toy Story in Central Park
518	2	September 5, 2006	Beyoncé in Central Park
519	3	September 6, 2006	Kevin Federline
520	4	September 7, 2006	Brad Garrett, Patrice O'Neal, Ivan Koumaev
521	5	September 8, 2006	Andre Agassi, Kim Basinger, Muse
522	6	September 11, 2006	Jessica Simpson, Ron Livingston, Storm Large
523	7	September 12, 2006	Hugh Laurie, Tommy Lee
524	8	September 13, 2006	Orlando Bloom, Bianca Ryan, Chi-Lan Lieu
525	9	September 14, 2006	Zach Braff, Outkast
526	10	September 15, 2006	The Rock, John Mayer
527	11	September 18, 2006	Julia Louis-Dreyfus, Bradley Whitford
528	12	September 19, 2006	Sir Elton John, Rainn Wilson
529	13	September 20, 2006	Dixie Chicks, Diane Lane
530	14	September 21, 2006	Sandra Oh, Josh Blue
531	15	September 22, 2006	Eva Longoria, Simon Baker, Cole & LD Miller
532	16	September 25, 2006	Matthew Perry, Kenny Chesney
533	17	September 26, 2006	Lauren Graham, Letoya, Emmitt Smith, Go Diego Go
534	18	September 27, 2006	Sting, Robert Downey Jr.
535	19	September 28, 2006	Howie Mandel, Chris Brown
536	20	September 29, 2006	Ashton Kutcher, Ludacris
537	21	October 2, 2006	Breast Cancer Awareness Sheryl Crow, Christina Applegate
538	22	October 3, 2006	Ted Danson, Robin Thicke, Jon Heder
539	23	October 4, 2006	Evangeline Lilly, Jesse Metcalfe
540	24	October 5, 2006	John Stamos, Andy Roddick, Prince Lorenzo Borghese
541	25	October 6, 2006	Marcia Cross, Rod Stewart, Mike Holmes
542	26	October 9, 2006	Leah Remini, Monica, Barry Watson
543	27	October 10, 2006	Wanda Sykes, Justin Chambers
544	28	October 11, 2006	Tiger Woods, America Ferrera
545	29	October 12, 2006	Allison Janney, Emeril Lagasse, Chingy
546	30	October 13, 2006	Calista Flockhart, Def Leppard
547	31	October 16, 2006	Bob Newhart, Amber Tamblyn, hypnotist Paul McKenna
548	32	October 17, 2006	James Spader, Rascal Flatts, Chi-Lan Lieu
549	33	October 18, 2006	Heidi Klum, John Krasinski
550	34	October 19, 2006	Jeff Corwin, Faith Hill
551	35	October 20, 2006	Hugh Jackman, Sarah McLachlan, cast of Go Diego Go
552	36	October 23, 2006	Kirsten Dunst, Judge Joe Brown The Peoples court
553	37	October 24, 2006	Tina Fey, Katherine Heigl, Corinne Bailey Rae
554	38	October 25, 2006	Annette Bening, JoJo
555	39	October 26, 2006	Amanda Peet, Rick Smith Jr.
556	40	October 27, 2006	Jon Cryer, Aaron Neville, Sharon Karriem
557	41	October 30, 2006	Tyra Banks, Barry Manilow
558	42	October 31, 2006	Patricia Arquette, Criss Angel, Jason Hawes and Grant Wilson of Ghost Hunters
559	43	November 1, 2006	Roseanne, Carrie Underwood
560	44	November 2, 2006	Salma Hayek, world's tallest Mohawk Aaron Studham
561	45	November 3, 2006	Sandra Bullock
562	46	November 6, 2006	Charlie Sheen, Tony Little, Richard Simmons
563	47	November 7, 2006	Russell Crowe, Hilary Duff
564	48	November 8, 2006	Emma Thompson, John Legend, The Flying Ace All Stars
565	49	November 9, 2006	Dustin Hoffman, Diddy, Hugh Hefner, Holly Madison
566	50	November 10, 2006	Janet Jackson, Brittany Murphy
567	51	November 13, 2006	Martha Stewart, Shemar Moore, Stuart Whitehurst
568	52	November 14, 2006	Will Ferrell, James Blunt
569	53	November 15, 2006	Robin Williams, John Legend
570	54	November 16, 2006	Felicity Huffman, Bianca Ryan, Tristan and Nic Puehse
571	55	November 17, 2006	Greg Kinnear, Tori Spelling
572	56	November 20, 2006	Penélope Cruz, Emmitt Smith
573	57	November 21, 2006	Bill Clinton, Bon Jovi, Jay-Z
574	58	November 22, 2006	Regis Philbin, Denzel Washington, Nathan Lane
575	59	November 23, 2006	-
576	60	November 24, 2006	Matt Lauer, Meredith Vieira
577	61	November 27, 2006	Matthew Broderick, Fred Willard, The Legends
578	62	November 28, 2006	Cameron Diaz, Chris Daughtry
579	63	November 29, 2006	Ben Affleck, Lucy Liu, Nathan Godsey
580	64	November 30, 2006	James Denton, Sara Ramirez
581	65	December 1, 2006	Minnie Driver, Bob Proctor, John Assaraf
582	66	December 4, 2006	Masi Oka, Hayden Panettiere, Sendhil Ramamurthy
583	67	December 5, 2006	Taye Diggs, Ciara
584	68	December 6, 2006	Jack Hanna, fitness trainer Bob Harper, Damien Rice
585	69	December 7, 2006	Emilio Estevez, Mike Holmes
586	70	December 8, 2006	Mel Gibson, Jo Frost, Mary J. Blige
587	71	December 11, 2006	William Shatner, Vanessa Marcil
588	72	December 12, 2006	Edward Norton, Anne Hathaway, The Fray
589	73	December 13, 2006	Jessica Biel, Shawn Wayans & Marlon Wayans
590	74	December 14, 2006	Dakota Fanning, Adam Beach, Natalie Cole
591	75	December 15, 2006	Kellie Pickler, Al Gore
592	76	January 2, 2007	Courteney Cox, John Mayer
593	77	January 3, 2007	Samuel L. Jackson, Eric Mabius
594	78	January 4, 2007	Matthew Fox, Martina Navratilova
595	79	January 5, 2007	Rob Lowe, Nick Graham
596	80	January 8, 2007	Jerry O'Connell, fitness trainer Bob Harper
597	81	January 9, 2007	Wesley Autrey, Hilary Swank
598	82	January 10, 2007	Patrick Dempsey, Indigo Girls, Lily Capehart
599	83	January 11, 2007	Nicollette Sheridan, Terri Irwin and Bindi Irwin
600	84	January 12, 2007	Jennifer Love Hewitt, restaurateurs the Scotto family
601	85	January 15, 2007	The cast of Little Miss Sunshine
602	86	January 16, 2007	Paula Abdul
603	87	January 17, 2007	T.R. Knight, K.T. Tunstall
604	88	January 18, 2007	Meredith Vieira, Omarion, personal trainer Bob Harper
605	89	January 19, 2007	Donald Trump, Milo Ventimiglia
606	90	January 22, 2007	Steve Harvey
607	91	January 23, 2007	Judge Judy Sheindlin, Little Bill
608	92	January 24, 2007	George Lopez
609	93	January 25, 2007	Julie Andrews
610	94	January 26, 2007	Wanda Sykes, Jeff Corwin, Ellen's birthday
611	95	January 29, 2007	David Arquette, Bob Harper, Marc Yu
612	96	January 30, 2007	D.L. Hughley
613	97	January 31, 2007	Barbara Walters, Serena Williams, Gym Class Heroes
614	98	February 1, 2007	Diane Keaton
615	99	February 2, 2007	Jennifer Lopez
616	100	February 5, 2007	David Spade
617	101	February 6, 2007	America Ferrera, Keane, David Frei
618	102	February 7, 2007	Christina Aguilera
619	103	February 8, 2007	Rebecca Romijn, Bob Harper
620	104	February 9, 2007	Gwen Stefani
621	105	February 12, 2007	Queen Latifah, Jennifer Hudson, Nelly Furtado
622	106	February 13, 2007	Peter O'Toole, Dominic Monaghan, Keith Barry
623	107	February 14, 2007	Drew Barrymore, Jason Lewis, Lionel Richie
624	108	February 15, 2007	Forest Whitaker, Billy Blanks Jr.
625	109	February 16, 2007	Ryan Phillippe, Bob Harper, Katharine McPhee
626	110	February 19, 2007	Hugh Grant
627	111	February 20, 2007	Harry Connick Jr., Mardi Gras
628	112	February 21, 2007	Dorothea Johnson, Chandra Wilson, Jimmy Kimmel
629	113	February 22, 2007	Oprah Winfrey
630	114	February 23, 2007	Cuba Gooding Jr., William H. Macy,
631	115	February 26, 2007	The Oscars Show
632	116	February 27, 2007	Best of 'Ellen'
633	117	February 28, 2007	John Legend, John Travolta
634	118	March 1, 2007	Brad Garrett
635	119	March 2, 2007	Bob Barker
636	120	March 5, 2007	Sandra Bullock, Julian McMahon
637	121	March 6, 2007	Jack Hanna, Cheryl Burke, Ian Ziering
638	122	March 7, 2007	Suzanne Somers, Brandon Rogers
639	123	March 8, 2007	Kevin Bacon, Eddie Izzard
640	124	March 9, 2007	Jeff Goldblum
641	125	March 12, 2007	Bob Woodruff, Lee Woodruff
642	126	March 13, 2007	Mark Wahlberg, Rainn Wilson
643	127	March 14, 2007	Terrence Howard, Joely Fisher
644	128	March 15, 2007	Will Ferrell, Elliott Yamin
645	129	March 16, 2007	Howie Mandel, Joey Fatone & Kym Johnson
646	130	March 19, 2007	Jennifer Lopez
647	131	March 20, 2007	–
648	132	March 21, 2007	Richard Gere, Amy Poehler
649	133	March 22, 2007	Hilary Duff, Billy Ray Cyrus
650	134	March 23, 2007	Leah Remini, Gina Glocksen
651	135	March 26, 2007	Tim McGraw, Ice Cube
652	136	March 27, 2007	Pink, Kurt Russell
653	137	March 28, 2007	Jeff Foxworthy, Meredith Baxter
654	138	March 29, 2007	Minnie Driver, Heather Mills
655	139	March 30, 2007	Jonathan Rhys Meyers, Dana Carvey
656	140	April 2, 2007	Luke Wilson, Greg Mathis
657	141	April 3, 2007	Sharon Stone
658	142	April 4, 2007	Neil Patrick Harris, Andrew Baldwin
659	143	April 5, 2007	Ryan Gosling
660	144	April 6, 2007	Julia Louis-Dreyfus, Sanjaya Malakar, Laura Dern
661	145	April 9, 2007	Stevie Nicks, Anthony Hopkins
662	146	April 10, 2007	Larry King, Suhaila Salimpour
663	147	April 11, 2007	Robin Williams
664	148	April 12, 2007	Michelle Pfeiffer, Adam Brody, Josh Groban
665	149	April 13, 2007	Simon Cowell, Joey Fatone, Kym Johnson
666	150	April 16, 2007	Ryan Seacrest, Bentley Green, Ellen on bed rest – Day 1
667	151	April 17, 2007	Lindsay Lohan, Venus Ramey, Ellen on bed rest – Day 2
668	152	April 18, 2007	Nathan Lane, Emma Schlenker, Ellen on bed rest – Day 3
669	153	April 19, 2007	Josh Duhamel, Jon Bon Jovi, Jay Leno, Ellen on bed rest – Day 4
670	154	April 20, 2007	Lauren Graham, Phil Stacey, Chris Richardson, Ellen on bed rest – Day 5
671	155	April 23, 2007	Tobey Maguire, Apolo Anton Ohno, Julianne Hough
672	156	April 24, 2007	Carmen Electra, Jason Lee
673	157	April 25, 2007	Kate Walsh, Kanye West, Donda West
674	158	April 26, 2007	Marcia Cross, Bryce Dallas Howard
675	159	April 27, 2007	Kelly Clarkson, LaKisha Jones
676	160	April 30, 2007	Cameron Diaz, Simran Sethi
677	161	May 1, 2007	Antonio Banderas, Curtis Stone
678	162	May 2, 2007	Harry Connick Jr., Cheri Oteri
679	163	May 3, 2007	Mike Myers, Teri Horton
680	164	May 4, 2007	Joey Fatone, Apolo Ohno, Valerie Bertinelli
681	165	May 7, 2007	Orlando Bloom, Jason Randal
682	166	May 8, 2007	Adam Levine, Demi Moore, Jack Hanna
683	167	May 9, 2007	Allison Janney, Kym Douglas
684	168	May 10, 2007	Debra Messing, Chris Daughtry
685	169	May 11, 2007	Katherine Heigl
686	170	May 14, 2007	Ashley Judd, Amazing Talents
687	171	May 15, 2007	Jordin Sparks, Cheryl Hines, Holly Hunter
