= The Ellen DeGeneres Show season 5 =

The Ellen DeGeneres Show
- Season 5
- Starring: Ellen DeGeneres
- No. of episodes: 150

Release
- Original release: September 4, 2007 – May 1, 2008

Season chronology
- ← Previous; Season 4 Next → Season 6

This is a list of episodes of the fifth season of The Ellen DeGeneres Show, which aired from September 2007 to June 2008.

== Episodes ==
| No. overall | No. in season | Original release date | Guests |
|---|---|---|---|
| 688 | 1 | September 4, 2007 | Sen. Hillary Clinton in New York City |
| 689 | 2 | September 5, 2007 | Faith Hill, Robin Roberts in New York City |
| 690 | 3 | September 6, 2007 | Eric Dane, Paula Deen, Butterscotch |
| 691 | 4 | September 7, 2007 | George Lopez, Jeff Corwin, Jeff Lewis of Flipping Out |
| 692 | 5 | September 10, 2007 | Daniel Radcliffe, Harvey Levin, Sabra Johnson |
| 693 | 6 | September 11, 2007 | Kathy Griffin, Kyle Lograsso |
| 694 | 7 | September 12, 2007 | Magician Hans Klok, Pamela Anderson, Ryan Seacrest |
| 695 | 8 | September 13, 2007 | Neil Patrick Harris, Rihanna |
| 696 | 9 | September 14, 2007 | Kanye West, Mariska Hargitay |
| 697 | 10 | September 17, 2007 | Wentworth Miller, Terry Fator |
| 698 | 11 | September 18, 2007 | Howie Mandel, Tori Spelling, Dean McDermott |
| 699 | 12 | September 19, 2007 | Brad Garrett, Sophia Wise, Mike Klinge, Amy Schumer |
| 700 | 13 | September 20, 2007 | Jessica Alba, Gary Vaynerchuk, Jim Parsons, cast of The Big Bang Theory |
| 701 | 14 | September 21, 2007 | Masi Oka, Steve Spangler, KT Tunstall |
| 702 | 15 | September 24, 2007 | David Spade, Jane Seymour, Tony Dovolani, Zoe Perry |
| 703 | 16 | September 25, 2007 | Taye Diggs, Brian Gaynor, James Blunt |
| 704 | 17 | September 26, 2007 | Greg Kinnear, Paul Potts, Kat Von D |
| 705 | 18 | September 27, 2007 | T.R. Knight, Chris Bryant |
| 706 | 19 | September 28, 2007 | Ben Stiller, Will.i.am, Paul Dateh |
| 707 | 20 | October 1, 2007 | Queen Latifah, Hunter Stewart |
| 708 | 21 | October 2, 2007 | Denis Leary, Dylan and Cole Sprouse, Kenna, Chris Bryant |
| 709 | 22 | October 3, 2007 | Jamie Foxx, Boys Like Girls, 6-year-old piano prodigy Emily Bear |
| 710 | 23 | October 4, 2007 | Tom Selleck, Nathan Fillion, Darrell Watson |
| 711 | 24 | October 5, 2007 | Sharon Osbourne, Jill Scott |
| 712 | 25 | October 8, 2007 | Mel B, Shawn Johnson, Matchbox Twenty |
| 713 | 26 | October 9, 2007 | Kate Walsh, Jack McBrayer, Pat Monahan |
| 714 | 27 | October 10, 2007 | Kate Hudson, Rita Wilson, Kristin Chenoweth |
| 715 | 28 | October 11, 2007 | Dana Carvey, Miley Cyrus, Billy Ray Cyrus |
| 716 | 29 | October 12, 2007 | Jerry O'Connell, Malin Akerman, Gretchen Wilson |
| 717 | 30 | October 15, 2007 | Ellen's house, Gordon Ramsay, Jennifer Connelly |
| 718 | 31 | October 16, 2007 | Drew Carey, Angie Stone, Gosselin Family |
| 719 | 32 | October 17, 2007 | Janet Jackson, Nicolai Calabria, Laura Bush |
| 720 | 33 | October 18, 2007 | Jake Gyllenhaal, Marc Cohn |
| 721 | 34 | October 19, 2007 | Reese Witherspoon |
| 722 | 35 | October 24, 2007 | Sir Anthony Hopkins, Nicole Scherzinger |
| 723 | 36 | October 25, 2007 | Steve Carell, pilot Bob Robertson, Kid Rock |
| 724 | 37 | October 26, 2007 | Halle Berry, the Jonas Brothers, Greg Grunberg |
| 725 | 38 | October 29, 2007 | Barack Obama, Sabrina Bryan, Mark Ballas |
| 726 | 39 | October 30, 2007 | Larry Himmel, Amy Brenneman |
| 727 | 40 | October 31, 2007 | Halloween Show – Jennifer Love Hewitt, Hans Klok, Rob Mies |
| 728 | 41 | November 1, 2007 | Tornado survivors, Victoria Beckham, Steve Spangler |
| 729 | 42 | November 2, 2007 | Kid inventors, Josh Duhamel |
| 730 | 43 | November 5, 2007 | Russell Crowe, Carrie Underwood |
| 731 | 44 | November 6, 2007 | Jenny McCarthy, Keith Urban |
| 732 | 45 | November 7, 2007 | America Ferrera, Glenda Smith, Lyle Lovett |
| 733 | 46 | November 8, 2007 | Hayden Panettiere, Alison Sweeney |
| 734 | 47 | November 9, 2007 | Vince Vaughn |
| 735 | 48 | November 12, 2007 | James Denton, Jennie Garth, Derek Hough |
| 736 | 49 | November 13, 2007 | Heidi Klum, Sean Casey |
| 737 | 50 | November 14, 2007 | Celine Dion, Donnie LaMar Harden |
| 738 | 51 | November 15, 2007 | Dwayne “The Rock” Johnson, Adam Levine |
| 739 | 52 | November 16, 2007 | James Taylor |
| 740 | 53 | November 19, 2007 | Christina Applegate |
| 741 | 54 | November 20, 2007 | Jeff Corwin, Soulja Boy Tell 'Em |
| 742 | 55 | November 21, 2007 | Mariah Carey, Duran Duran |
| 743 | 56 | November 23, 2007 | Julianne Hough, Emily Bear |
| 744 | 57 | November 26, 2007 | Tom Brokaw, Joey Fatone, Logan Smalley, Darius Weems |
| 745 | 58 | November 27, 2007 | Anderson Cooper, Howie Mandel, Derek Martinez, DeAnna Pappas |
| 746 | 59 | November 28, 2007 | Paris Hilton, Derek Martinez |
| 747 | 60 | November 29, 2007 | Rocco DiSpirito, Jordin Sparks |
| 748 | 61 | November 30, 2007 | Brad Womack, Ingrid Marie Rivera, Keith Urban |
| 749 | 62 | December 3, 2007 | OneRepublic, Dakota Blue Richards, Vanessa Williams |
| 750 | 63 | December 4, 2007 | Snoop Dogg, Bryan Dattilo, David Frei |
| 751 | 64 | December 5, 2007 | Jenna Bush, Ryan Shaw |
| 752 | 65 | December 6, 2007 | Day 1 of 12 Days of Giveaways - Toby Keith, Keira Knightley |
| 753 | 66 | December 7, 2007 | Day 2 of 12 Days of Giveaways - Paula Deen, Anthony Gargiula, Trisha Yearwood |
| 754 | 67 | December 10, 2007 | Day 3 of 12 Days of Giveaways - Bonnie Brown, Chace Crawford, Allison Janney |
| 755 | 68 | December 11, 2007 | Day 4 of 12 Days of Giveaways - Padma Lakshmi, Blake Lewis |
| 756 | 69 | December 12, 2007 | Day 5 of 12 Days of Giveaways - Vince Mira, Alison Sweeney |
| 757 | 70 | December 13, 2007 | Day 6 of 12 Days of Giveaways - Tippi Hedren, Alec Mapa |
| 758 | 71 | December 14, 2007 | Day 7 of 12 Days of Giveaways - David Gray, Ty Pennington |
| 759 | 72 | December 17, 2007 | Day 8 of 12 Days of Giveaways - Chris Bryant, Jeff Lewis, Jane Seymour |
| 760 | 73 | December 18, 2007 | Day 9 of 12 Days of Giveaways - Colbie Caillat, Carmen Electra, Neil Tejwani |
| 761 | 74 | December 19, 2007 | Day 10 of 12 Days of Giveaways - Wolfgang Puck, Andrew Zuckerman |
| 762 | 75 | December 20, 2007 | Day 11 of 12 Days of Giveaways - Ricki Lake, Jason Randal, Ashley Tisdale |
| 763 | 76 | December 21, 2007 | Day 12 of 12 Days of Giveaways - Bill Germanakos, Maria Sharapova |
| 764 | 77 | January 7, 2007 | Scott Baio, Kym Douglas, Marc Yu |
| 765 | 78 | January 8, 2008 | Emily Bear, Tim Gunn, Elliot Page (Note: Credited as Ellen Page) |
| 766 | 79 | January 9, 2008 | John Legend, Tristan Puehse, Ivanka Trump, Janice Wolf |
| 767 | 80 | January 10, 2008 | Mary J. Blige, Anthony Gargiula |
| 768 | 81 | January 11, 2008 | Cody McCasland, Kimberley Locke |
| 769 | 82 | January 14, 2008 | Maria Bartiromo, Plain White T's |
| 770 | 83 | January 15, 2008 | Dr. Drew Pinsky, Keith Barry |
| 771 | 84 | January 16, 2008 | Marilu Henner, Joshua Radin, Jane Hambleton |
| 772 | 85 | January 17, 2008 | TBA |
| 773 | 85 | January 18, 2008 | Curtis Bray, Mallory Bray, Mick Cornett |
| 774 | 86 | January 18, 2008 | Meredith Vieira, OMarion, Bob Harper |
| 775 | 86 | January 21, 2008 | Terri Irwin, Bindi Irwin, Jonas Brothers |
| 776 | 87 | January 22, 2008 | Selena Gomez, Kellie Pickler |
| 777 | 88 | January 23, 2008 | Jeff Corwin |
| 776 | 89 | January 24, 2008 | Natasha Bedingfield |
| 777 | 90 | January 25, 2008 | Ellen's 50th Birthday Special |
| 778 | 91 | January 28, 2008 | Mo'Nique, Sandra Lee, Jack Davis |
| 779 | 92 | January 29, 2008 | Alice Smith, The Scottos |
| 780 | 93 | January 30, 2008 | Sara Bareilles, Niki Taylor |
| 781 | 94 | January 31, 2008 | Trista Sutter, DeAnna Pappas, Sean Giambrone |
| 782 | 95 | February 1, 2008 | Bobby Brown, Jeanne Benedict |
| 783 | 96 | February 4, 2008 | Ryan Sheckler, Jack Hanna |
| 784 | 97 | February 5, 2008 | Reggie Bush |
| 785 | 98 | February 6, 2008 | Cameron Mathison, Kym Douglas |
| 786 | 99 | February 7, 2008 | Joey Fatone, Ephraim Salaam, Chester Pitts |
| 787 | 100 | February 8, 2008 | Paris Hilton, Lupe Fiasco |
| 788 | 101 | February 11, 2008 | Grammy Awards, Taylor Swift, Daughtry |
| 789 | 102 | February 12, 2008 | Elle Macpherson, Keyshia Cole |
| 790 | 103 | February 13, 2008 | Richard Branson, Steve Spangler |
| 791 | 104 | February 14, 2008 | Mario Lopez, Bret Michaels, Timmy Mitchum |
| 792 | 105 | February 18, 2008 | Mark L. Walberg, Flo Rida |
| 793 | 106 | February 19, 2008 | Josiah Leming, Giada De Laurentis |
| 794 | 107 | February 20, 2008 | Christina Aguilera |
| 795 | 108 | February 21, 2008 | Willie Nelson, Larry the Cable Guy |
| 796 | 109 | February 22, 2008 | Elliot Page, Kyle Ensley, Danica Patrick |
| 797 | 110 | February 25, 2008 | 100,000 Game Week Garth Brooks, |
| 798 | 111 | February 26, 2008 | Martin Lawrence, Kevin O'Connell |
| 799 | 112 | February 27, 2008 | Heidi Klum, Dorothea Johnson |
| 800 | 113 | February 28, 2008 | Reese Witherspoon, Barack Obama, Jim Cramer |
| 801 | 114 | February 29, 2008 | Janet Jackson, Dr. Wayne Dyer |
| 802 | 115 | March 10, 2008 | Lauren Conrad, Jo Frost |
| 803 | 116 | March 11, 2008 | Raven-Symoné, Christian Siriano |
| 804 | 117 | March 12, 2008 | Wanda Sykes, Danny Noriega |
| 805 | 118 | March 13, 2008 | Steve Carell, Steven Strait |
| 806 | 119 | March 14, 2008 | Tom Arnold, Yael Naim, Stacy Westfall |
| 807 | 120 | March 17, 2008 | Sheryl Crow, Minnie Driver, David Hernandez |
| 808 | 121 | March 18, 2008 | Cheryl Hines, Paul McKenna |
| 809 | 122 | March 19, 2008 | Blair Underwood, Chris Matthews |
| 810 | 123 | March 20, 2008 | Pamela Anderson, Margaret Cho |
| 811 | 124 | March 21, 2008 | Leslie Mann, Fabian Sanchez |
| 812 | 125 | March 27, 2008 | Ryan Phillippe, Suze Orman, Colin Cowie |
| 813 | 126 | March 28, 2008 | Courteney Cox, Bode Miller |
| 814 | 127 | March 31, 2008 | Jeff Foxworthy, Flo Rida |
| 815 | 128 | April 1, 2008 | Jonas Brothers |
| 816 | 129 | April 2, 2008 | Boys Like Girls |
| 817 | 130 | April 3, 2008 | Abigail Breslin |
| 818 | 131 | April 4, 2008 | Forest Whitaker, B-52s |
| 819 | 132 | April 7, 2008 | Hillary Clinton, Kylie Minogue |
| 820 | 133 | April 8, 2008 | Thomas Haden Church, Chris Daughtry |
| 821 | 134 | April 9, 2008 | Jimmy Kimmel |
| 822 | 135 | April 10, 2008 | Jackie Chan, Graham Colton |
| 823 | 136 | April 11, 2008 | Marcia Cross, Leona Lewis |
| 824 | 137 | April 14, 2008 | David Spade |
| 825 | 138 | April 15, 2008 | SheMar Moore, Steve Spangler, Kristin Williams |
| 826 | 139 | April 16, 2008 | Suzanne Somers, Benjamin McKenzie |
| 827 | 140 | April 17, 2008 | America Ferrera |
| 828 | 141 | April 18, 2008 | Jonah Hill, Lady Antebellum |
| 829 | 142 | April 21, 2008 | Ewan McGregor, Jason Segel, Kristy Lee Cook |
| 830 | 143 | April 22, 2008 | Randy Jackson, Dr. Wayne Dyer |
| 831 | 144 | April 23, 2008 | Neil Patrick Harris |
| 832 | 145 | April 24, 2008 | David Beckham, Ashlee Simpson |
| 833 | 146 | April 25, 2008 | Nicollette Sheridan |
| 834 | 147 | April 28, 2008 | Jack Hanna, Carly Smithson |
| 835 | 148 | April 29, 2008 | Helen Hunt, Def Leppard |
| 836 | 149 | April 30, 2008 | Pierce Brosnan, Kym Douglas |
| 837 | 150 | May 1, 2008 | Patrick Dempsey, Boys Like Girls |
