= The Ellen DeGeneres Show season 6 =

The Ellen DeGeneres Show
- Season 6
- Starring: Ellen DeGeneres
- No. of episodes: 172

Release
- Original release: September 8, 2008 – June 5, 2009

Season chronology
- ← Previous; Season 5 Next → Season 7

This is a list of episodes of the sixth season of The Ellen DeGeneres Show, which aired from September 2008 to June 2009.

== Episodes ==
No. overall	No. in season	Original release date	Guests
838	1	September 8, 2008	Michelle Obama, Jonas Brothers, Ellen now broadcasting in HD
839	2	September 9, 2008	Mindy Weiss, Shawn Johnson
840	3	September 10, 2008	Leona Lewis, Annette Bening, Joshua Allen
841	4	September 11, 2008	Pamela Anderson, Misty May-Treanor, Kerri Walsh
842	5	September 12, 2008	Jennie Garth, LL Cool J
843	6	September 15, 2008	Ryan Seacrest, Jason Lezak, Brian Austin Green
844	7	September 16, 2008	Kate Hudson, Erin Jackson
845	8	September 17, 2008	Meg Ryan, Stephenie Meyer, Ne-Yo
846	9	September 18, 2008	Benjamin Bratt, Nelly, Akon, Ashanti
847	10	September 19, 2008	Neil Patrick Harris, Betty White
848	11	September 22, 2008	Dolly Parton, Simon Baker, Heather Brammer
849	12	September 23, 2008	Allison Janney, Wolfgang Puck, The Pussycat Dolls
850	13	September 24, 2008	Sharon Osbourne, Michelle Monaghan
851	14	September 25, 2008	Eric Dane, Kid Rock
852	15	September 26, 2008	Shia LaBeouf, Rosie Perez, Mario Lopez
853	16	September 29, 2008	Lauren Graham, Lance Bass, Lacey Schwimmer
854	17	September 30, 2008	Lucy Liu, Steve Spangler, Joshua Radin
855	18	October 1, 2008	Suzanne Somers, Demi Lovato
856	19	October 2, 2008	George Lopez, Jack Hanna
857	20	October 3, 2008	Jenny McCarthy, Amy MacDonald, Connie Talbot
858	21	October 6, 2008	Julia Louis-Dreyfus, Maurice Greene, Cheryl Burke
859	22	October 7, 2008	Paris Hilton, Kanye West, Regina and Maya Pitts
860	23	October 8, 2008	Taye Diggs, Audrina Patridge, Kanye West
861	24	October 9, 2008	Harry Connick Jr., Chris Brown, Zachary Levi
862	25	October 10, 2008	Christina Applegate, Sheryl Crow
863	26	October 13, 2008	Mark Wahlberg, Cody Linley, Julianne Hough
864	27	October 14, 2008	Dennis Quaid, Jesse McCartney, Isaac Mizrahi
865	28	October 15, 2008	Dakota Fanning, Misty May-Treanor
866	29	October 16, 2008	Lisa Kudrow, Natasha Bedingfield, Jalen Testerman
867	30	October 17, 2008	Nicole Richie, Kenny Chesney
868	31	October 20, 2008	Colin Farrell, Joe Biden, Toni Braxton
869	32	October 21, 2008	Kristin Chenoweth, Robin Thicke
870	33	October 22, 2008	Christian Slater, Mila Kunis, Jason Mraz
871	34	October 23, 2008	Hayden Panettiere
872	35	October 24, 2008	Vanessa Hudgens, Warren Sapp, Kym Johnson
873	36	October 27, 2008	Hilary Swank, Bonnie Hunt, Warren Sapp
874	37	October 28, 2008	Chris Rock, Elizabeth Banks
875	38	October 29, 2008	Jennifer Love Hewitt, Ashley Tisdale, Kellie Pickler
876	39	October 30, 2008	Zac Efron, Paris Hilton
877	40	October 31, 2008	Wanda Sykes
878	41	November 3, 2008	Cher, Pussycat Dolls, Missy Elliott
879	42	November 5, 2008	Patrick Dempsey, Tione Johnson
880	43	November 6, 2008	Samuel L. Jackson
881	44	November 7, 2008	John Legend, Kym Douglas
882	45	November 10, 2008	Heidi Klum, Seann William Scott, Susan Lucci
883	46	November 11, 2008	Taylor Swift, Justin Timberlake
884	47	November 12, 2008	Emma Thompson, Dido
885	48	November 13, 2008	Steve Carell
886	49	November 14, 2008	David Archuleta, Minnie Driver
887	50	November 17, 2008	Kate Walsh, Brooke Burke, Derek Hough
888	51	November 18, 2008	Hugh Laurie
889	52	November 19, 2008	Jessica Simpson, Chace Crawford, Brian Boyle
890	53	November 20, 2008	Chris Matthews, Miley Cyrus
891	54	November 21, 2008	John Travolta, Robert Pattinson
892	55	November 24, 2008	Bette Midler, Pink
893	56	November 25, 2008	Beyoncé
894	57	November 26, 2008	Mariah Carey, Milon Simone
895	58	November 27, 2008	Stephenie Meyer, Meg Ryan
896	59	November 28, 2008	Dolly Parton
897	60	December 1, 2008	David Cook, Dr. Drew Pinsky
898	61	December 2, 2008	D.L. Hughley, Lady Gaga
899	62	December 3, 2008	Noah Wyle, Keane
900	63	December 4, 2008	Alison Sweeney, Ludacris
901	64	December 5, 2008	Jimmy Smits, Jaden Smith, Katy Perry
902	65	December 8, 2008	James Spader, Beyoncé, Brian Williams
903	66	December 9, 2008	Anthony Lapaglia, Darius Rucker
904	67	December 10, 2008	Kate Beckinsale, Adele, Chester Pitts
905	68	December 11, 2008	Courteney Cox, Common, Clint Eastwood
906	69	December 12, 2008	Amanda Peet, Jon Hamm, Barry Manilow
907	70	December 15, 2008	Diddy, John Garcia
908	71	December 16, 2008	Britney Spears, Kate Winslet, Anthony Hamilton
909	72	December 17, 2008	Jim Carrey, Eric Benet
910	73	December 18, 2008	Rosario Dawson, The Plain White T's
911	74	December 19, 2008	Carmen Electra, Anna Faris, Pussycat Dolls
912	75	January 5, 2009	Eva Mendes, Kevin McKidd
913	76	January 6, 2009	Marisa Tomei, Foreigner, Deepak Chopra
914	77	January 7, 2009	Akon
915	78	January 8, 2009	Anne Hathaway
916	79	January 9, 2009	Clint Eastwood, Jason Mesnick
917	80	January 12, 2009	Wolf Blitzer
918	81	January 13, 2009	Randy Jackson, Dr. Wayne Dyer, Michelle Aguilar
919	82	January 14, 2009	Dustin Hoffman, Brandt Bickford
920	83	January 15, 2009	Chandra Wilson, Tione Johnson
921	84	January 16, 2009	Nicollette Sheridan, The All-American Rejects
922	85	January 19, 2009	George Clooney, Kiefer Sutherland, T.I.
923	86	January 20, 2009	Beyoncé
924	87	January 21, 2009	Barack Obama, Jimmy Fallon, Kelli Williams
925	88	January 22, 2009	Brendan Fraser, Emily Deschanel
926	89	January 23, 2009	Kyra Sedgwick, Howie Mandel
927	90	January 26, 2009	Amy Poehler, James Morrison
928	91	January 27, 2009	Joey Fatone, O.A.R.
929	92	January 28, 2009	Ted Danson, Ernie Bjorkman
930	93	January 29, 2009	Kevin Nealon, Chris Harrison
931	94	January 30, 2009	Alyson Hannigan, Brandon Wilson
932	95	February 2, 2009	Heidi Klum, Justin Long, Marco Borges
933	96	February 3, 2009	Josh Brolin, Pink with Butch Walker
934	97	February 4, 2009	Penélope Cruz, Dylan and Cole Sprouse, Q-Tip
935	98	February 5, 2009	Drew Barrymore, Taraji P. Henson.
936	99	February 6, 2009	Jennifer Aniston, Stevie Wonder
937	100	February 9, 2009	John Mayer, Josh Groban, Lady Antebellum, Chester Pitts
938	101	February 10, 2009	Amy Brenneman, Jason Mraz and Colbie Caillat
939	102	February 11, 2009	Mel B, Eric Dane, Robin Tunney, Melinda Doolittle
940	103	February 12, 2009	Steve Harvey, Kurt Warner, Dr. Neil Shaw
941	104	February 13, 2009	John Legend, Jerry O'Connell
942	105	February 16, 2009	Simon Baker, Miranda Cosgrove
943	106	February 17, 2009	The Jonas Brothers, Mel B
944	107	February 18, 2009	Naomi Watts, Lily Allen
945	108	February 19, 2009	Jeff Probst, Nick Carter
946	109	February 20, 2009	George Lopez, Bar Refaeli
947	110	February 23, 2009	Meredith Vieira, Olivia Wilde
948	111	February 24, 2009	Richard Simmons, Serena Williams, Raphael Saadiq
949	112	February 25, 2009	Denise Richards, Chyler Leigh, Fabio Viviani
950	113	February 26, 2009	Mario Lopez, the Bird and the Bee
951	114	February 27, 2009	David Arquette, Fall Out Boy
952	115	March 2, 2009	Neil Patrick Harris, Kaley Cuoco
953	116	March 3, 2009	Judge Judy Sheindlin, Bret Michaels, Matt Nathanson
954	117	March 4, 2009	Eric McCormack, Chris Harrison, Anthony LaPaglia, the Fray
955	118	March 5, 2009	Melissa Rycroft, Kym Douglas
956	119	March 6, 2009	Jason Mesnick and Molly Malaney, Steve Spangler
957	120	March 9, 2009	Paris Hilton
958	121	March 10, 2009	Carla Gugino, Sean "Diddy" Combs, Taylor Hicks
959	122	March 11, 2009	Carol Burnett, Taylor Hicks
960	123	March 12, 2009	Felicity Huffman, Rascal Flatts
961	124	March 13, 2009	Dwayne "The Rock" Johnson, Elle Fanning
962	125	March 16, 2009	Portia de Rossi, Jorge Nunez and Jasmine Murray
963	126	March 17, 2009	Julia Louis-Dreyfus, Andy Samberg
964	127	March 18, 2009	Zach Braff, Jenna Fischer
965	128	March 19, 2009	Anderson Cooper, Katy Perry
966	129	March 20, 2009	Paul Rudd, Gavin Rossdale, Brett Sodetz
967	130	March 23, 2009	Noah Wyle, Alexis Grace
968	131	March 24, 2009	Kara DioGuardi, M.C. Hammer
969	132	March 25, 2009	John Stamos, Emily Blunt
970	133	March 26, 2009	Jennifer Hudson
971	134	March 27, 2009	Reese Witherspoon, Bobby Flay
972	135	March 30, 2009	David Spade, Gilles Marini and Cheryl Burke
973	136	March 31, 2009	Halle Berry, Flo Rida
974	137	April 1, 2009	Christina Applegate, Keith Urban
975	138	April 2, 2009	Howie Mandel, Ben Mckenzie
976	139	April 3, 2009	Marilu Henner, Lil' Kim and Derek Hough, Martina McBride
977	140	April 13, 2009	Patricia Arquette, Wayne Hoffman, Rascal Flatts
978	141	April 14, 2009	Jenny McCarthy, Mary McCormack, Natasha Bedingfield
979	142	April 15, 2009	Zac Efron, Demi Lovato
980	143	April 16, 2009	Jessica Lange, Melissa Rycroft, Ludacris
981	144	April 17, 2009	Drew Barrymore, Barry Watson, the Pussycat Dolls
982	145	April 20, 2009	Leslie Mann, Rashida Jones, Pussycat Dolls
983	146	April 21, 2009	Jimmy Kimmel, Marilyn Milian, Brett Dennen
984	147	April 22, 2009	Jennifer Love Hewitt, Chicago
985	148	April 23, 2009	Lindsay Lohan, Alec Greven, Prince
986	149	April 24, 2009	Matthew Perry, Leighton Meester
987	150	April 27, 2009	Kristin Chenoweth, Anoop Desai and Lil Rounds
988	151	April 28, 2009	Kate Walsh, Dierks Bentley, Brandt Bickford
989	152	April 29, 2009	Michael Douglas, Faryl Smith
990	153	April 30, 2009	Ryan Reynolds, Emily Bear
991	154	May 1, 2009	Matthew McConaughey
992	155	May 4, 2009	Heidi Klum, Annie Duke, Matt Giraud
993	156	May 5, 2009	Simon Cowell, Zachary Quinto, the Black Eyed Peas
994	157	May 6, 2009	Hugh Jackman, Chris Pine
995	158	May 7, 2009	Vanessa Hudgens, Steven Purugganan, Kym Douglas
996	159	May 8, 2009	Ryan Seacrest, Alison Sweeney
997	160	May 11, 2009	Jon Cryer, Allison Iraheta, Alison Sweeney
998	161	May 12, 2009	Matthew Fox, Julianne Moore, Lady Gaga
999	162	May 13, 2009	Jay Leno, Ciara
1,000	163	May 14, 2009	Anderson Cooper, Kelly Clarkson
1,001	164	May 15, 2009	Ewan McGregor, the winner of The Biggest Loser, Pink
1,002	165	May 18, 2009	Jamie Foxx, Marisa Miller, Umi Garrett
1,003	166	May 19, 2009	George Lopez, No Doubt
1,004	167	May 20, 2009	Ben Stiller, David Cook
1,005	168	May 21, 2009	Kevin Nealon, Tamar Geller, Michael Johns
1,006	169	May 22, 2009	Queen Latifah, Wayne Dyer, Rob Thomas
1,007	170	May 25, 2009	Steve Martin
1,008	171	May 26, 2009	Mandy Moore, Kris Allen
1,009	172	June 5, 2009	Jessica Biel, Kathy Freston, Kellie Pickler
