= Galanes =

Galanes is a surname. Notable people with the surname include:

- Jim Galanes (born 1956), American skier
- Joseph Galanes (born 1965), American cross-country skier
- Philip Galanes (born 1962), American writer and lawyer
