= The Ellen DeGeneres Show season 8 =

The Ellen DeGeneres Show
- Season 8
- Starring: Ellen DeGeneres
- No. of episodes: 171

Release
- Original release: September 13, 2010 – June 1, 2011

Season chronology
- ← Previous; Season 7 Next → Season 9

This is a list of episodes of the eighth season of The Ellen DeGeneres Show, which aired from September 2010 to June 2011.

== Episodes ==
No. overall	No. in season	Original release date	Guests
1,183	1	September 13, 2010	MTV Video Music Awards! Lady Gaga
1,184	2	September 14, 2010	Lauren Graham
1,185	3	September 15, 2010	Jane Lynch
1,186	4	September 15, 2010	Ben Affleck
1,187	5	September 17, 2010	Mary-Kate and Ashley Olsen
1,188	6	September 20, 2010	Courteney Cox
1,189	7	September 21, 2010	Hugh Laurie
1,190	8	September 22, 2010	Brooke Shields
1,191	9	September 23, 2010	Ed Helms
1,192	10	September 24, 2010	Jimmy Smits
1,193	11	September 27, 2010	LL Cool J
1,194	12	September 28, 2010	John Stamos
1,195	13	September 29, 2010	Patrick Dempsey
1,196	14	September 30, 2010	Ellen Hits Broadway! Sir Anthony Hopkins
1,197	15	October 1, 2010	Breast Cancer Awareness Show!Jennifer Grey
1,198	16	October 4, 2010	Ellen Pompeo
1,199	17	October 5, 2010	Jenny McCarthy
1,200	18	October 6, 2010	Felicity Huffman
1,201	19	October 7, 2010	Howie Mandel
1,202	20	October 8, 2010	Michael C. Hall
1,203	21	October 11, 2010	Mike Sorrentino & Karina Smirnoff
1,204	22	October 12, 2010	Bruce Willis
1,205	23	October 13, 2010	Minnie Driver
1,206	24	October 14, 2010	Simon Baker
1,207	25	October 15, 2010	Eva Longoria Parker
1,208	26	October 18, 2010	Russell Brand
1,209	27	October 19, 2010	Chris O'Donnell
1,210	28	October 20, 2010	Jeff Foxworthy
1,211	29	October 21, 2010	Clint Eastwood
1,212	30	October 22, 2010	Wanda Sykes
1,213	31	October 25, 2010	Hilary Duff
1,214	32	October 26, 2010	Greyson Chance
1,215	33	October 27, 2010	David Beckham
1,216	34	October 28, 2010	First Lady Michelle Obama
1,217	35	October 29, 2010	Halloween Show! Vanessa Williams
1,218	36	November 1, 2010	Taylor Swift
1,219	37	November 2, 2010	Mariah Carey
1,220	38	November 3, 2010	Sofia Vergara
1,221	39	November 4, 2010	Portia De Rossi
1,222	40	November 5, 2010	James Franco
1,223	41	November 8, 2010	Day 1 of Game Week! Jim Parsons
1,224	42	November 9, 2010	Day 2 of Game Week! Madonna
1,225	43	November 10, 2010	Day 3 of Game Week! Queen Latifah
1,226	44	November 11, 2010	Day 4 of Game Week! Ricky Martin
1,227	45	November 12, 2010	Day 5 of Game Week - Finale! Chris Pine
1,228	46	November 15, 2010	Halle Berry
1,229	47	November 16, 2010	Diane Keaton
1,230	48	November 17, 2010	Russell Crowe
1,231	49	November 18, 2010	Eric Dane
1,232	50	November 19, 2010	Christina Aguilera
1,233	51	November 22, 2010	Justin Timberlake
1,234	52	November 23, 2010	Eric Stonestreet
1,235	53	November 24, 2010	Dwayne Johnson
1,236	54	November 25, 2010	LL Cool J
1,237	55	November 26, 2010	Heidi Klum, Ne-Yo
1,238	56	November 29, 2010	Alyson Hannigan
1,239	57	November 30, 2010	Eva Mendes
1,240	58	December 1, 2010	Ben Affleck
1,241	59	December 2, 2010	Day 1 of 12 Days of Giveaways ! Taylor Swift
1,242	60	December 3, 2010	Day 2 of 12 Days of Giveaways ! Hilary Swank
1,243	61	December 6, 2010	Day 3 of 12 Days of Giveaways ! Nicole Richie
1,244	62	December 7, 2010	Day 4 of 12 Days of Giveaways ! Ty Burrell
1,245	63	December 8, 2010	Day 5 of 12 Days of Giveaways ! Katy Perry, Helen Mirren
1,246	64	December 9, 2010	Day 6 of 12 Days of Giveaways ! Keith Urban
1,247	65	December 10, 2010	Day 7 of 12 Days of Giveaways ! Jane Fonda
1,248	66	December 13, 2010	Day 8 of 12 Days of Giveaways ! Jamie Foxx
1,249	67	December 14, 2010	Day 9 of 12 Days of Giveaways ! Steve Carell
1,250	68	December 15, 2010	Day 10 of 12 Days of Giveaways ! Mark Wahlberg
1,251	69	December 16, 2010	Day 11 of 12 Days of Giveaways ! Tim McGraw
1,252	70	December 17, 2010	Day 12 of 12 Days of Giveaways ! Reese Witherspoon
1,253	71	January 3, 2011	Ray Romano
1,254	72	January 4, 2011	Jimmy Kimmel
1,255	73	January 5, 2011	Macy Gray
1,256	74	January 6, 2011	Tom Selleck
1,257	75	January 7, 2011	Ryan Gosling
1,258	76	January 10, 2011	Dennis Quaid
1,259	77	January 11, 2011	Paula Abdul
1,260	78	January 12, 2011	Jenny McCarthy
1,261	79	January 13, 2011	Ricky Gervais
1,262	80	January 14, 2011	Vince Vaughn
1,263	81	January 17, 2011	Seth Rogen
1,264	82	January 18, 2011	Jennifer Lopez
1,265	83	January 19, 2011	Natalie Portman
1,266	84	January 20, 2011	Amy Poehler
1,267	85	January 21, 2011	Jeff Bridges
1,268	86	January 24, 2011	Minnie Driver
1,269	87	January 25, 2011	Drew Brees
1,270	88	January 26, 2011	Ellen's Surprise Birthday Party!
1,271	89	January 27, 2011	Sir Anthony Hopkins
1,272	90	January 28, 2011	Shemar Moore
1,273	91	January 31, 2011	Jesse Tyler Ferguson
1,274	92	February 1, 2011	Julianna Margulies
1,275	93	February 2, 2011	The Real Housewives of Beverly Hills
1,276	94	February 3, 2011	Jennifer Aniston
1,277	95	February 4, 2011	Super Bowl Show
1,278	96	February 7, 2011	1,300th Show!
1,279	97	February 8, 2011	Matthew Perry
1,280	98	February 9, 2011	Justin Bieber
1,281	99	February 10, 2011	Clay Matthews
1,282	100	February 11, 2011	Ricky Martin
1,283	101	February 14, 2011	Lady Antebellum
1,284	102	February 15, 2011	Randy Jackson
1,285	103	February 16, 2011	Liam Neeson
1,286	104	February 17, 2011	Howie Mandel
1,287	105	February 18, 2011	Cory Monteith
1,288	106	February 21, 2011	Mike Sorrentino
1,289	107	February 22, 2011	Aaron Rodgers
1,290	108	February 23, 2011	Kellie Pickler
1,291	109	February 24, 2011	Pam Anderson
1,292	110	February 25, 2011	Game Week Finale
1,293	111	February 28, 2011	Hugh Laurie
1,294	112	March 1, 2011	Heidi Klum
1,295	113	March 2, 2011	Matt Damon
1,296	114	March 3, 2011	Wanda Sykes
1,297	115	March 4, 2011	Jerry O'Connell
1,298	116	March 7, 2011	Paris Hilton
1,299	117	March 8, 2011	Ellen Pompeo
1,300	118	March 9, 2011	Valerie Bertinelli
1,301	119	March 10, 2011	Tyra Banks
1,302	120	March 11, 2011	Ryan Phillippe
1,303	121	March 21, 2011	Jimmy Fallon
1,304	122	March 22, 2011	Clive Owen
1,305	123	March 23, 2011	Vanessa Hudgens
1,306	124	March 24, 2011	David Schwimmer
1,307	125	March 25, 2011	Matthew McConaughey
1,308	126	March 28, 2011	Keith Urban
1,309	127	March 29, 2011	Greg Kinnear
1,310	128	March 30, 2011	Jennifer Hudson and Savannah Robinson
1,311	129	March 31, 2011	Helen Hunt
1,312	130	April 1, 2011	Katie Holmes
1,313	131	April 5, 2011	Orlando, LL Cool J
1,314	132	April 6, 2011	Orlando, Eric Stonestreet
1,315	133	April 7, 2011	Carrie Underwood
1,316	134	April 8, 2011	Kim Cattrall
1,317	135	April 11, 2011	Dwayne Johnson
1,318	136	April 12, 2011	Khloe Kardashian Odom & Lamar Odom
1,319	137	April 13, 2011	Anne Hathaway
1,320	138	April 14, 2011	Kate Walsh
1,321	139	April 15, 2011	Jamie Foxx
1,322	140	April 18, 2011	Tyler Perry
1,323	141	April 19, 2011	Tina Fey
1,324	142	April 20, 2011	Robert Pattinson
1,325	143	April 21, 2011	Reese Witherspoon
1,326	144	April 22, 2011	Gwyneth Paltrow
1,327	145	April 25, 2011	Mario Lopez
1,328	146	April 26, 2011	Christina Aguilera
1,329	147	April 27, 2011	Kristin Chenoweth
1,330	148	April 28, 2011	Lady GaGa
1,331	149	April 29, 2011	Orlando Bloom
1,332	150	May 2, 2011	Steve Carell
1,333	151	May 3, 2011	Steve Martin
1,334	152	May 4, 2011	John Krasinski
1,335	153	May 5, 2011	Kirstie Alley & Maksim Chmerkovskiy
1,336	154	May 6, 2011	Mother's Day Show
1,337	155	May 9, 2011	David Spade
1,338	156	May 10, 2011	Jennifer Lopez
1,339	157	May 11, 2011	Taylor Swift
1,340	158	May 12, 2011	Shania Twain
1,341	159	May 13, 2011	Colin Farrell
1,342	160	May 16, 2011	Shia LaBeouf
1,343	161	May 17, 2011	Bradley Cooper
1,344	162	May 18, 2011	Patrick Dempsey
1,345	163	May 19, 2011	Josh Duhamel
1,346	164	May 20, 2011	Jessica Alba
1,347	165	May 23, 2011	Ed Helms
1,348	166	May 24, 2011	Tom Hanks
1,349	167	May 26, 2011	John Rich
1,350	168	May 27, 2011	Dolly Parton
1,351	169	May 30, 2011	Meredith Vieira
1,352	170	May 31, 2011	Rob Lowe
1,353	171	June 1, 2011	Howie Mandel
