= The Ellen DeGeneres Show season 7 =

The Ellen DeGeneres Show
- Season 7
- Starring: Ellen DeGeneres
- No. of episodes: 173

Release
- Original release: September 7, 2009 – May 28, 2010

Season chronology
- ← Previous; Season 6 Next → Season 8

This is a list of episodes of the seventh season of The Ellen DeGeneres Show, which aired from September 2009 to June 2010.

== Episodes ==
No. overall	No. in season	Original release date	Guests
1,010	1	September 7, 2009	Mariah Carey
1,011	2	September 8, 2009	David Beckham
1,012	3	September 9, 2009	The Real Housewives of Atlanta
1,013	4	September 10, 2009	Kate Beckinsale
1,014	5	September 11, 2009	Katherine Heigl
1,015	6	September 14, 2009	Sharon Osbourne
1,016	7	September 15, 2009	Queen Latifah
1,017	8	September 16, 2009	Jennifer Aniston
1,018	9	September 17, 2009	Ted Danson
1,019	10	September 18, 2009	Neil Patrick Harris
1,020	11	September 21, 2009	Jennifer Love Hewitt
1,021	12	September 22, 2009	Jennifer Garner
1,022	13	September 23, 2009	Courteney Cox
1,023	14	September 24, 2009	Christina Applegate and Dave Annable
1,024	15	September 25, 2009	Patricia Arquette
1,025	16	September 28, 2009	Rebecca Romijn
1,026	17	September 29, 2009	Drew Barrymore
1,027	18	September 30, 2009	Heidi Klum
1,028	19	October 1, 2009	Kate Walsh
1,029	20	October 2, 2009	Felicity Huffman
1,030	21	October 5, 2009	Julia Louis-Dreyfus
1,031	22	October 6, 2009	Rob Lowe
1,032	23	October 7, 2009	Elliot Page
1,033	24	October 8, 2009	Clive Owen
1,034	25	October 9, 2009	Jason Bateman
1,035	26	October 12, 2009	Vince Vaughn
1,036	27	October 13, 2009	Jimmy Smits
1,037	28	October 14, 2009	Alison Sweeney
1,038	29	October 15, 2009	Taye Diggs
1,039	30	October 16, 2009	Marcia Cross
1,040	31	October 19, 2009	Hayden Panettiere
1,041	32	October 20, 2009	Lauren Graham
1,042	33	October 21, 2009	Mario Lopez
1,043	34	October 22, 2009	David Spade
1,044	35	October 23, 2009	Alyson Hannigan
1,045	36	October 26, 2009	Hilary Swank
1,046	37	October 27, 2009	Jimmy Kimmel
1,047	38	October 28, 2009	Katie Couric
1,048	39	October 29, 2009	Taylor Swift
1,049	40	October 30, 2009	Halloween Show
1,050	41	November 2, 2009	Jim Carrey
1,051	42	November 3, 2009	Mo'Nique
1,052	43	November 4, 2009	Mariah Carey
1,053	44	November 5, 2009	Amy Poehler
1,054	45	November 6, 2009	Pamela Anderson
1,055	46	November 9, 2009	George Lopez
1,056	47	November 10, 2009	Jenny McCarthy
1,057	48	November 11, 2009	John and Ella Bleu Travolta
1,058	49	November 12, 2009	Harry Connick Jr.
1,059	50	November 13, 2009	Ryan Seacrest
1,060	51	November 16, 2009	Dakota Fanning
1,061	52	November 17, 2009	Dwayne Johnson
1,062	53	November 18, 2009	Carrie Underwood
1,063	54	November 19, 2009	Simon Baker
1,064	55	November 20, 2009	Robert Pattinson
1,065	56	November 23, 2009	Jon Bon Jovi
1,066	57	November 24, 2009	Penélope Cruz
1,067	58	November 25, 2009	Sandra Bullock
1,068	59	November 27, 2009	Lady Gaga
1,069	60	December 1, 2009	Adam Lambert
1,070	61	December 2, 2009	Matt Dillon
1,071	62	December 3, 2009	Jennifer Lopez
1,072	63	December 4, 2009	Tobey Maguire
1,073	64	December 7, 2009	Zach Braff
1,074	65	December 8, 2009	Clint Eastwood
1,075	66	December 9, 2009	Howie Mandel
1,076	67	December 10, 2009	Steve Harvey
1,077	68	December 11, 2009	Selena Gomez
1,078	69	December 14, 2009	Ray Romano
1,079	70	December 15, 2009	John Mayer
1,080	71	December 16, 2009	Paris Hilton
1,081	72	December 17, 2009	Craig Ferguson
1,082	73	December 18, 2009	John Krasinski
1,083	74	January 4, 2010	Christian Slater
1,084	75	January 5, 2010	Helen Mirren
1,085	76	January 6, 2010	Queen Latifah
1,086	77	January 7, 2010	Wanda Sykes
1,087	78	January 8, 2010	Jackie Chan
1,088	79	January 11, 2010	Matthew Broderick
1,089	80	January 12, 2010	Bette Midler
1,090	81	January 13, 2010	Josh Holloway
1,091	82	January 14, 2010	Edward Norton
1,092	83	January 15, 2010	Mark Wahlberg
1,093	84	January 18, 2010	Keith Urban
1,094	85	January 19, 2010	Jeff Bridges
1,095	86	January 20, 2010	Dennis Quaid
1,096	87	January 21, 2010	Colin Firth
1,097	88	January 22, 2010	Sean Hayes
1,098	89	January 25, 2010	Valerie Bertinelli
1,099	90	January 26, 2010	Ellen's birthday show
1,100	91	January 27, 2010	Jenna Elfman
1,101	92	January 28, 2010	Mario Lopez
1,102	93	January 29, 2010	Josh Duhamel
1,103	94	February 1, 2010	Ellen's Grammy Show
1,104	95	February 2, 2010	LL Cool J
1,105	96	February 3, 2010	Ellen Pompeo
1,106	97	February 4, 2010	Heidi Klum
1,107	98	February 5, 2010	Super Bowl Show
1,108	99	February 8, 2010	1,100th Show
1,109	100	February 9, 2010	Bradley Cooper
1,110	101	February 10, 2010	Demi Moore
1,111	102	February 11, 2010	Patrick Dempsey
1,112	103	February 12, 2010	Valentine's Day Show
1,113	104	February 15, 2010	Eric Dane
1,114	105	February 16, 2010	Mardi Gras Show
1,115	106	February 17, 2010	Tracy Morgan
1,116	107	February 18, 2010	Kate Walsh
1,117	108	February 19, 2010	Game Week Finale
1,118	109	February 22, 2010	Randy Jackson
1,119	110	February 23, 2010	Ewan McGregor
1,120	111	February 24, 2010	Woody Harrelson
1,121	112	February 25, 2010	Felicity Huffman
1,122	113	February 26, 2010	Jimmy Kimmel
1,123	114	March 1, 2010	David Spade
1,124	115	March 2, 2010	Lauren Graham
1,125	116	March 3, 2010	Courteney Cox
1,126	117	March 4, 2010	Simon Baker
1,127	118	March 5, 2010	Jeremy Renner, Lenny Kravitz, Evan Lysacek
1,128	119	March 9, 2010	Nicole Richie, Ben McKenzie
1,129	120	March 10, 2010	Dominic Monaghan, Jonathan Safran Foer
1,130	121	March 11, 2010	Ed Helms, Isaiah Mustafa, Vedera
1,131	122	March 12, 2010	Chris O'Donnell, Melissa Rycroft
1,132	123	March 15, 2010	Demi Moore, Channing Tatum, Michael Bublé
1,133	124	March 16, 2010	Julianna Margulies, James Galea, La Roux
1,134	125	March 17, 2010	Ty Burrell, Maria Bartiromo, One eskimO
1,135	126	March 18, 2010	Pamela Anderson, José Andrés, Jamie Cullum
1,136	127	March 19, 2010	Constance McMillen, Chelsea Handler, Lacey Brown
1,137	128	March 22, 2010	Pierce Brosnan, Betty White, Melanie Fiona
1,138	129	March 23, 2010	Kristin Chenoweth, Jean-Christophe Novelli
1,139	130	March 24, 2010	Gerard Butler, Sonya Fitzpatrick
1,140	131	March 31, 2010	Miley Cyrus, John Corbett, James Dupre
1,141	132	April 1, 2010	Sharon Osbourne, Usher, Paige Miles
1,142	133	April 2, 2010	Mario Lopez, Rascal Flatts
1,143	134	April 5, 2010	Ellen Pompeo, Bubba Watson, Nick Jonas
1,144	135	April 6, 2010	Ryan Seacrest, Mary McCormack, Citizen Cope
1,145	136	April 7, 2010	Emily Deschanel, Shemar Moore, Roberto Martin
1,146	137	April 8, 2010	Martin Lawrence, Didi Benami
1,147	138	April 9, 2010	Julie Bowen, Chad Ochocinco, Cheryl Burke
1,148	139	April 12, 2010	Eva Longoria Parker, Crystal Swing
1,149	140	April 13, 2010	Kirstie Alley, Cyndi Lauper, Matthew Morrison
1,150	141	April 14, 2010	Alyson Hannigan, Maria Bartiromo, V.V. Brown
1,151	142	April 15, 2010	David Duchovny, Aziz Ansari, Nikki & Rich
1,152	143	April 16, 2010	Hilary Duff, Andrew Garcia & Alan Jackson
1,153	144	April 19, 2010	Howie Mandel, Tori Spelling, Nicole Scherzinger
1,154	145	April 20, 2010	Lisa Kudrow, B.o.B., Bruno Mars
1,155	146	April 21, 2010	Martin Short, Jerry Weintraub & Gretchen Wilson
1,156	147	April 22, 2010	Wanda Sykes, Evan Lysacek, Jason Castro
1,157	148	April 23, 2010	Jennifer Lopez, Norah Jones
1,158	149	April 26, 2010	Annette Bening, Steve Spangler
1,159	150	April 27, 2010	Marisa Tomei, Toni Braxton
1,160	151	April 28, 2010	Jessica Simpson, Shakira
1,161	152	April 29, 2010	Heidi Klum, Chris Colfer
1,162	153	April 30, 2010	Paris Hilton, Kathy Hilton, Siobhan Magnus
1,163	154	May 3, 2010	Kiefer Sutherland
1,164	155	May 4, 2010	Samuel L. Jackson, Lea Michele, Grace Potter
1,165	156	May 5, 2010	Scarlett Johansson, Melissa Etheridge
1,166	157	May 6, 2010	Gwyneth Paltrow
1,167	158	May 7, 2010	Dennis Quaid, Michael Bolton, Aaron Kelly
1,168	159	May 10, 2010	Russell Crowe, Eric Stonestreet
1,169	160	May 11, 2010	Julia Louis-Dreyfus, Slash & Adam Levine, Cory Monteith
1,170	161	May 12, 2010	Ryan Phillippe, Miranda Kerr, Court Yard Hounds
1,171	162	May 13, 2010	Rob Lowe, Common
1,172	163	May 14, 2010	Teri Hatcher, Paramore, Michael Lynche
1,173	164	May 17, 2010	Queen Latifah, Justin Bieber
1,174	165	May 18, 2010	Steve Carell, Nikki Reed, James Taylor & Carole King
1,175	166	May 19, 2010	Robert Pattinson, Adam Lambert
1,176	167	May 20, 2010	Antonio Banderas, Weezer
1,177	168	May 21, 2010	Eddie Murphy, Jason Lewis, Casey James
1,178	169	May 24, 2010	Jon Hamm, Natasha Bedingfield, Ali Fedotowsky
1,179	170	May 25, 2010	Simon Cowell, Jack Johnson
1,180	171	May 26, 2010	Greyson Chance, Colin Farrell, Janelle Monae
1,181	172	May 27, 2010	Ashton Kutcher, Chely Wright
1,182	173	May 28, 2010	Lee DeWyze
