= Chi-Lan Lieu =

Chinese-American author and TV presenter

Chi-Lan Lieu is a Chinese-American author and television presenter. Since September 2012 she has hosted the HGTV series Living Abroad. Lieu has previously hosted other programs on HGTV, TechTV, Fact or Faked on the Syfy channel, The Big Tease on Reelz Channel, and G4, including I Want That! Tech Toys (HGTV) and Fresh Gear (TechTV). She also played the role as one of the assistants of Arthur Griffin, on Big Time Rush from 2009 to 2013.

In addition to her television roles, Lieu has been a technology columnist for Stuff magazine.

Along TechTV personalities, Lieu appeared in the 2006 music video Strange New Element.
