= Philip Galanes =

American writer and lawyer

- Born: October 4, 1962 (age 64); New York City, U.S.
- Occupations: writer; novelist; lawyer; executive
- Writing career
- Language: English
- Genres: Essays, nonfiction

Philip Galanes (born October 4, 1962) is an American writer with two novels, Father's Day in 2004 and Emma's Table in 2008, a contributor to The New York Times since the mid-1980s, and the weekly contributor of the "Social Q's" column to their Sunday Styles section since June 2008. He has also worked, based on his legal training, as a lawyer and company executive.

== Early life and education ==
Philip Galanes was born on October 4, 1962, in New York City. He grew up in the readership area of the Brattleboro Reformer, from which he read to his family the "Dear Abby" family-advice column six days a week in his self-appointed roles as the "family fixer".

Galanes received B.A. and J.D. degrees from Yale College and Yale Law School in 1984 and 1991, respectively.

== Career ==
Prior to 2001, Galanes was employed as COO by the children's media company, Golden Books Family Entertainment. Immediately following that, he had developed "a budding business advising collectors on the acquisition of Modernist furniture, rugs, fabrics and lighting". In 2008 he is described as being "a corporate and entertainment lawyer in private practice". He has worked at the law firms of Paul Weiss Rifkind Wharton and Garrison, and Debevoise and Plimpton.

Galanes has published two novels, Father's Day in 2004, described by Belinda Goldsmith of Reuters as being "about a man whose father committed suicide" as Galanes' father had, and Emma's Table: A Novel, described by Galanes to an interviewer in its publication year of 2008 as "a comedy of manners that centers around a celebrity decorator and merchandising mogul reminiscent of Martha Stewart". His name appears in the writer compilations, Contemporary Authors (2005) and Contemporary Authors New Revision Series (2010).

In late 1984 through March 1985, Galanes contributed at least four articles to The New York Times, including two reviews of fiction and other pieces. As of May 2023, Galanes continued as The New York Times writer of the modern-day advice column "Social Q's", which appears weekly in the Sunday Styles section, a role he has filled since June 2008. As characterized by radio interviewer Terry Gross, the essays "offe[r] advice on how to handle difficult social situations at work and at home, as well as how to deal with new etiquette questions relating to texting, email and social media". The column came about when a Times editor who had read one of Galanes's novels proposed he try the new medium.

A selection of Galanes's essays from the column have been published in book form. Galanes also monitors the "Social Q's" group on Facebook, where members discuss current topics.

=== Media appearances ===
Galanes has appeared on television in connection with his column; he has been interviewed on The Gayle King Show, The Ellen DeGeneres Show, and Plum TV. He has also appeared on Today with Hoda Kotb and Kathie Lee Gifford. Galanes has also been on a number of NPR programs.

== Personal life ==
Galanes' father died of a self-inflicted gunshot when Galanes was 23, a fact that Galanes kept secret for a decade while substituting fictional causes of his father's death. Galanes has said that writing Father's Day was a step in his coming to terms with his father's death. His mother Kathleen Galanes who died in 2014 was a Roman Catholic of Syrian descent. https://www.atamaniuk.com/obituaries/Kathleen-Z-Galanes?obId=2111951

As of 2004, Galanes' partner was Michael Haverland, then an assistant professor at the Yale School of Architecture, and they shared a dwelling in East Hampton, New York.
