= The Ellen DeGeneres Show =

American syndicated talk show (2003–2022)

- Also known as: Ellen
- Genre: Talk show; Comedy
- Created by: Ellen DeGeneres
- Presented by: Ellen DeGeneres
- Opening theme: "Ellen" by Sharlotte Gibson (season 1); "Ellen" (Remix) by Sharlotte Gibson (seasons 2–3); "Have a Little Fun Today" by Sharlotte Gibson (seasons 4–12); "Today's the Day" by Pink (seasons 13–19)
- Country of origin: United States
- Original language: English
- No. of seasons: 19
- No. of episodes: 3,339 (list of episodes)

Production
- Executive producers: Ellen DeGeneres; Stephen "tWitch" Boss (2020–2022); Andy Lassner (2003–2022); Mary Connelly (2006–2022); Derek Westervelt (2006–2022); Kevin A. Leman II (2003–2020); Ed Glavin (2006–2020); Jim Paratore (2003–2012)
- Camera setup: Multi-camera
- Running time: 30–60 minutes
- Production companies: A Very Good Production; Telepictures Productions; Warner Bros. Television; WAD Productions, Inc. (2004–2022)

Original release
- Network: Syndication
- Release: September 8, 2003 – May 26, 2022 (Note: Ellen hosted her final episode on May 26, with guest hosts presenting the final week. Clip episodes subsequently aired until June 17, 2022.)

Related
- The Ellen Show; Ellen's Design Challenge; Ellen's Game of Games; Family Game Fight!

The Ellen DeGeneres Show, commonly shortened to The Ellen Show or Ellen, is an American first-run syndicated talk show that was hosted by Ellen DeGeneres. The show ran for nineteen seasons from September 8, 2003, to May 26, 2022, with 3,339 episodes broadcast in total. It was produced by Telepictures Productions. The majority of stations owned by NBC Owned Television Stations, along with Hearst Television and Tegna, served as the program's largest affiliate base. For its first five seasons, the show was taped in Studio 11 at NBC Studios in Burbank, California. From season 6 onwards, the show moved to being taped at Stage 1 on the nearby Warner Bros. lot. Since the beginning of the sixth season, The Ellen DeGeneres Show was broadcast in high definition.

The show received 171 Daytime Emmy Award nominations and won 63 Daytime Emmy Awards as of 2022, including four for Outstanding Talk Show and seven for Outstanding Talk Show Entertainment, making 11 total awards and surpassing the record held by The Oprah Winfrey Show, which won nine as Outstanding Talk Show before it was divided into two categories (Informative and Entertainment) in 2008. The show also won 17 People's Choice Awards. On May 21, 2019, DeGeneres announced she had signed for three more years, renewing the show through 2022. The eighteenth season premiered on September 21, 2020. On May 12, 2021, DeGeneres announced that the nineteenth season would be her last, which premiered on September 13, 2021.

The final episode aired on May 26, 2022, as previously announced on March 17. New episodes with guest hosts, archival clip shows hosted by DeGeneres and others, and repeats aired on stations across the United States until September 9, after which most stations (including NBC O&Os) began occupying the show's time slot with new newscasts or syndication programs such as The Kelly Clarkson Show. The show ended due to a combination of declining ratings following allegations of a toxic workplace environment and DeGeneres's own desire to move on creatively.

== Concept ==
The program combines comedy, celebrity, musical guests, and human-interest stories. The program often features audience participation games where prizes are awarded. During her Twelve Days of Giveaways promotion, audience members receive roughly $3,000 worth of prizes on each of the twelve episodes. Because the show has become so popular, not all who arrive hoping to see a taping can fit into the studio, so an offshoot space was created. People seated here are often referenced and shown briefly on camera but watch the taping from off-stage. Other non-celebrities have been featured in an attempt by DeGeneres to give them 15 minutes of fame. Guests in this role have included intelligent children and small business owners. In the show's third season, DeGeneres began surprising fans by introducing them to their favorite celebrities.

=== Recurring elements ===
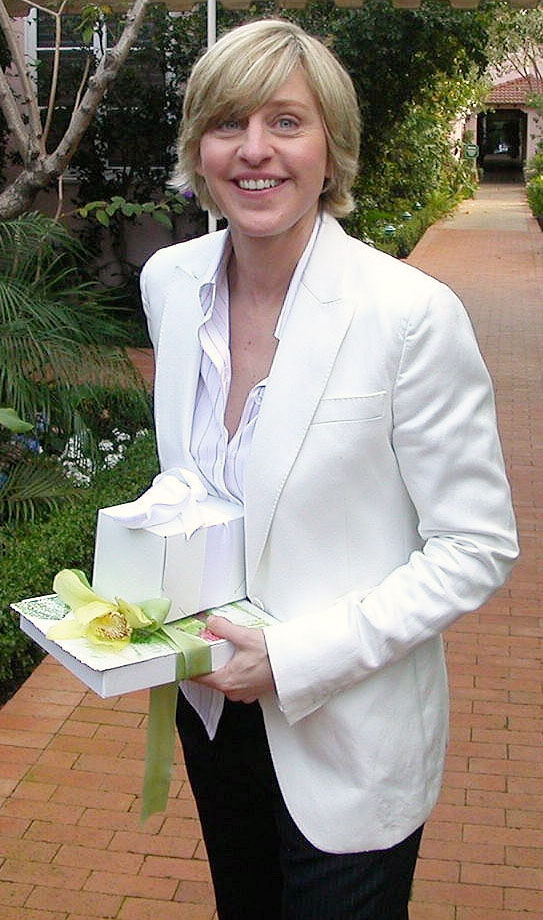
Ellen DeGeneres in 2004

Several recurring sounds, gags, and catchphrases are used by DeGeneres depending on the topic of discussion or theme for a specific episode. For example, after DeGeneres says the phrase, "Aww Snap!", the sound effect of a whip cracking often is played. In her monologue, DeGeneres frequently thanks the audience's applause by saying "I feel the same way about you!" Other video segments include DeGeneres scaring people, playing pranks, taking part in faux-breaking news segments and interacting with crew members. Other recurring segments include those where DeGeneres comments on Internet videos, tabloid-style photographs of celebrities, advertisements on Craigslist, or voicemails left for her on an answering machine. Some segments feature audience members more prominently, including having audience members show hidden talents, pictures of others that resemble DeGeneres, and interviewing children.

DeGeneres frequently plays games with audience members and awards prizes based on their performance. Games have included Pictionary-style drawing games, finding hidden objects within the studio, category, current event or pop-culture-based trivia, and various other stunt and charade-based games. DeGeneres also joked several times on the show about when a sequel to Finding Nemo, in which she famously had a lead role, would eventually release, as well as make references to the film. Eventually, the sequel, Finding Dory, was officially announced by DeGeneres.

==== Segments (including former and recurring) ====
The show has many recurring segments throughout the years. Some include:

- Oh Hair No! is a segment that involves fans sending DeGeneres pictures of their funny haircuts, some of which appear on the show.
- Know or Go is a segment involving three audience members (as contestants) who answer questions based on different topics such as Thanksgiving and current events. Upon an incorrect answer, the contestant gets dropped through a trapdoor. The remaining contestant will have to answer 3 questions correctly in a row in order to win the game.
- Clumsy Thumbsy is a segment in which DeGeneres shows messed up auto corrects sent in by fans.
- Oh Puh-lice is a segment in which odd police reports are shown.
- Ellen's Dance Dare is a segment in which viewers send videos of themselves secretly dancing behind oblivious people. Irish jigs were featured on the 2012 St. Patrick's Day episode. Many celebrities have participated such as Emma Stone, Zac Efron, Lilly Singh, The Janoskians and Taylor Swift.
- Bad Paid-for Tattoos Odd, usually misspelled body art is displayed.
- A Little Yelp from My Friends DeGeneres reads reviews from the website Yelp.
- "What's Wrong with These Photos?" Photos Silly photos sent in by viewers are featured.
- "What's Wrong with These Videos?" Videos DeGeneres shares funny moments from TV that aren't quite right.
- Baby, Baby, Baby, Oh! Baby, Baby, Baby, Photo! DeGeneres shares funny baby photos sent in from viewers.
- Ellen Answers Your Questions About Taxes And When She Can't, She Calls Someone From H&R Block Audience members ask DeGeneres various questions relating to taxes. If DeGeneres doesn't know the answer, she calls various H&R Block offices from around the US.
- Ellen and tWitch Guess What's Going to Happen Next In This Crazy (Foreign) Commercial tWitch and DeGeneres are shown clips of funny commercials, and must guess what will happen next from a list of possible outcomes.
- "What Were They Thinking?" Audience Dancing Audience members are shown dancing with voices acting out the dancers' thoughts.
- "What's Wrong with These Signs?" Signs Viewers send DeGeneres pictures of signs that aren't quite right.
- Looky Looky at this Booky / Me Read Books DeGeneres shares books with funny covers and titles sent in by viewers.
- Awesome Album Covers Viewers send DeGeneres records with bad covers.
- A picture's Worth Five Thousand Dollars DeGeneres shares old photos of herself sent in by viewers, choosing one photo to win five thousand dollars.
- Oh Come On! DeGeneres shares things that make her say oh come on!
- Oh, Straight People DeGeneres shows slightly amusing news headlines, punctuating each headline by saying Oh, Straight People.
- $#*! My Mama Says DeGeneres' mother, Betty DeGeneres, reads out funny lines in a serious manner, occasionally reading out lines sent in by viewers. This segment is a direct response to the CBS sitcom $h*! My Dad Says.
- What the BLANK is Your Secret Secrets from audience members are shown, with various words blanked out. tWitch and DeGeneres then try to guess what the missing words are, questioning the audience member for clues. If none of them guess it correctly, letters can be revealed.
- Spill the Tea/ Spill the talents A game where DeGeneres has to match secrets to a panel of five audience members. Ulike similar games, DeGeneres does not question the contestants, simply matching the secrets based on intuition. After all secrets are correctly matched, each contestant tells the story of their secret. A variation featuring hidden talents has also been played.
- Really Real Real Estate DeGeneres shares funny real estate listings.
- World Wide Whaat? DeGeneres shows off strange, funny and useless websites.
- Beach, Please! Viewers send in mildly infuriating moments from their lives, with the person deemed most inconvenienced winning a vacation getaway.
- Tony Karaoke is a segment that features the show's DJ, Tony, singing often wrong-but-hilarious lyrics to popular songs.
- Tea Time with Sophia Grace and Rosie is a segment in which Sophia Grace & Rosie interview celebrity guests on the show, all while enjoying cookies and tea.
- OMKalen features Kalen Allen reacting, often dramatically, to videos. The segment has become recurring on EllenTube.
- ApPARENTly Confused a spinoff of the segment Clumsy Thumbsy, DeGeneres shows messages written by parents who don't understand texting and technology.
- In Your FACEbook is a segment in which DeGeneres shares funny Facebook photos taken from the profile pages of audience members.
- I Thought You Were My Friend DeGeneres shares funny Facebook photos taken from the profile pages of audience member's Facebook friends.
- "What Have YOU Been Up to on Facebook?" is a recurring segment in which DeGeneres reveals some personal and private information of the public to the audience.
- INSTA-grammification is a segment in which DeGeneres shares funny and unusual pictures from the show's Instagram page.
- "Vine After Vine"/ Fresh Off the Vine is a segment in which DeGeneres shares 6-second video clips from the once popular mobile app Vine.
- Weekly Tweetly Roundup is a segment in which DeGeneres shares funny and interesting tweets.
- Classic Joke Thursday is a segment in which DeGeneres shares funny jokes/puns, usually in a conversation with the show's DJ.
- This Plus That is a segment in which a montage of dancing audience members is shown usually combined with humorous sound effects.
- Just KID-ink is a segment in which DeGeneres shares funny drawings from kids.
- "Grand Design" an online segment in which DeGeneres, with presenters and home makeover experts the "Kitchen Cousins" John Colaneri and Anthony Carrino would redesign a room in just 24 hours on a budget of $1,000.
- "Starbucks Prank!" is a recurring segment in which DeGeneres sends popular celebrities out to Starbucks to prank the cashiers.
- "What the Heck Are These Kids Talking About?" is a former segment in which DeGeneres reviews rap lyrics and tries to figure out what they mean.
- "Celebrity Pranks!" is a segment in which DeGeneres often pulls a prank or scares celebrity guests, although she once pranked a pair of best friends she brought on the show (one posted a video of scaring the other every day for a year). Although any celebrity can fall victim to it at any time, some have fallen for it often including Taylor Swift, Eric Stonestreet, Sarah Paulson, and Selena Gomez, who have each fallen for it at least five times over multiple appearances. On several occasions, the celebrity is pranked more than once during the same show (Octavia Spencer and Sam Smith as well as the previously mentioned ones). Some pranks include (but are not limited to) scaring guests in the dressing room (usually the bathroom), having a staff member or another celebrity scare them onstage during the interview (using various methods ranging from simple to inventive), or backstage shenanigans where her own staff, particularly Andy Lassner, are frequent victims as well. On occasion the prank fails to scare the intended target, usually prompting a wisecrack from DeGeneres (e.g. Russell Crowe, Colin Farrell, Daniel Radcliffe, and Garth Brooks). DeGeneres herself is an occasional target but has proven to be very difficult to pull a prank on with two celebrities (Steve Carell and Matt Lauer) being the only ones to successfully prank her as of April 2021.
- "Chat Time With Ellen!" is a talk-show segment in which DeGeneres talks about—or to—people who have made viral videos.
- Can Andy Say That? is a segment in which DeGeneres has the show's executive producer, Andy Lassner, repeat funny phrases that are filled with double entendres and sexual innuendo.
- Haunted House (the segment is actually untitled) is an annual segment in which DeGeneres sends her writer, Amy Rhodes, to various haunted houses in the days leading up to Halloween. In later years, Amy was joined in the haunted houses by her own mother, as well as the show's executive producer Andy Lassner. After Andy's stint going through with Amy, DeGeneres has made him go through every year, replacing Amy after she left the show. He's been joined by other DeGeneres staff members as well as celebrities like Ariana Grande, Taylor Swift, Eric Stonestreet, Sarah Paulson, and DeGeneres's wife Portia de Rossi (as well as others) have also been sent to a haunted house. In one instance, DeGeneres herself joined Andy and went through a haunted house based on the 2017 film It. On other occasions some of DeGeneres' staff (Integrations Assistant Mackenzie, producer Matt Wright and Kalen Allen) went through without Andy. DeGeneres has occasionally sent celebrities on their own as well (Katie Lowes and Guillermo Diaz for example).
- Average Andy is a segment in which DeGeneres sends her executive producer Andy Lassner to learn new skills from the world's most talented people.
- Throwback Thursday is a segment in which every Thursday DeGeneres revisits funny moments from previous seasons.
- "Who's in My Bushes?" is a segment in which a celebrity is hidden in decorative bushes in which DeGeneres will ask questions to that celebrity and eventually comes out when figured. However, during this segment, DeGeneres already knows who the celebrity is and the audience will just play along.
- Take That, China! is a segment in which DeGeneres makes jokes about impractical and often unwise American inventions.
- Breaking News is a segment in which news anchor Devin Scillian interrupts the show and delivers unusually mundane, humorous breaking news.
- Why I Don't Have Kids is a segment in which DeGeneres shows pictures or videos sent in by viewers of crazy situations they have encountered with their kids.
- Epic or Fail is a segment considered to be DeGeneres' favorite game, in which DeGeneres shows several stunts or tricks caught on tape, and when the videos are paused, DeGeneres, the audience, guest celebrities and tWitch have to guess the ending's outcome.
- Hot Hands is a game in which some audience member or celebrities get on a special seat and name the celebrities which are shown on the screen as much as possible in 30 seconds.
- 5 Second Rule is a game in which DeGeneres and celebrity contestants have to think on their feet and list three answers that fall into a given category in only five seconds.
- Ellen in Your Ear is a segment in which celebrities interact with unsuspecting people, with DeGeneres instructing the celebrities through remote earpiece.
- Ask Dr. Dax is a segment in which Dax Shepard gives relationship advice to audience members, while often telling stories about his own experiences.
- What's in the Box? is a segment in which DeGeneres gives out gifts through boxes, curtains and small games such as three-card monte. Gifts can include iPads, watches and even holidays
- Hubba Hubba Quiz Quiz is a segment in which DeGeneres questions men.
- Don't Leave Me Hanging is a game in which DeGeneres questions people. If they get a strike, they get lifted into the air. If they get three strikes, they get lifted all the way to the top.
- Ellen, Rate My Baby is a segment in which DeGeneres rates pictures of babies sent in by her viewers from a scale of 1-10 (She goes over 10, e.g. 17/10)
- Make it Rain is a game in which two (usually male) celebrities have to answer questions. If they answer correctly they get a chance to stand under one of several umbrellas and pull a string. One of the umbrellas releases money, which goes to a charity of the winner's choice. The other umbrellas release water, which ends up making the celebrity wet.
- Me Me Monday is a segment in which DeGeneres shows a collection of funny memes and comments on them.
- Danger Word is a word association game reminiscent of Password, where audience members must guess a word from clues without saying the titular "danger word" (such as "cereal" being the danger word for "Cheerios"). If the player guesses the winning word, the opponent gets a strike and gets sprayed by one of the cannons. If a person guesses the danger word, that person gets a strike and gets sprayed.
- Thank GIF It's Friday is a segment in which DeGeneres shows GIF's that people post on the Internet. She shows these on Fridays.
- One-Eyed Monster is a game in which two player took turns entering the monster's mouth where they will be questioned by DeGeneres. The answer itself ranged from 0 to 5. For each number the contestant is off, he or she must pull one of the monster's teeth. However, one of the monster's teeth will cause the monster jaws to snap shut.
- Silhou-What Screen Is Hiding Andy Lassner/tWitch? A game where three silhouettes stand behind screens, with DeGeneres trying to guess which one of them is her producer Andy Lassner by asking various questions. A variation featuring tWitch has also been played
- The Masked Dancer is a segment spoofing the series The Masked Singer (to which DeGeneres notes that Fox had not sued her yet), where DeGeneres and tWitch attempt to guess the identity of a mystery guest concealed with a costume mask. Actual Masked Singer panelist Ken Jeong made an appearance as a guest judge on one episode. In January 2020, it was announced that Fox and Warner Bros. would produce The Masked Dancer as an actual spin-off of The Masked Singer, with DeGeneres as executive producer.
- Burning Questions is a game where a celebrity guest sits in a chair in front of a buzzer while DeGeneres asks them a slew of personal (sometimes embarrassing) questions. The celebrity hits the buzzer when they answer the question.

Heads Up!

Heads Up! is a game that DeGeneres plays with other celebrities. Originally, the game had players guess words or phrases on physical cards held to their foreheads by watching the other players act it out or give hints as time counted down. Later, DeGeneres and Warner Bros. Entertainment developed an app version of the game. The app became a huge success after its May 2013 launch, rising to the top of the App Store with over 650,000 downloads during its first month. By July 2016, it had been downloaded more than 25 million times and remained one of Apple's top-paid apps.

==== Dancing ====
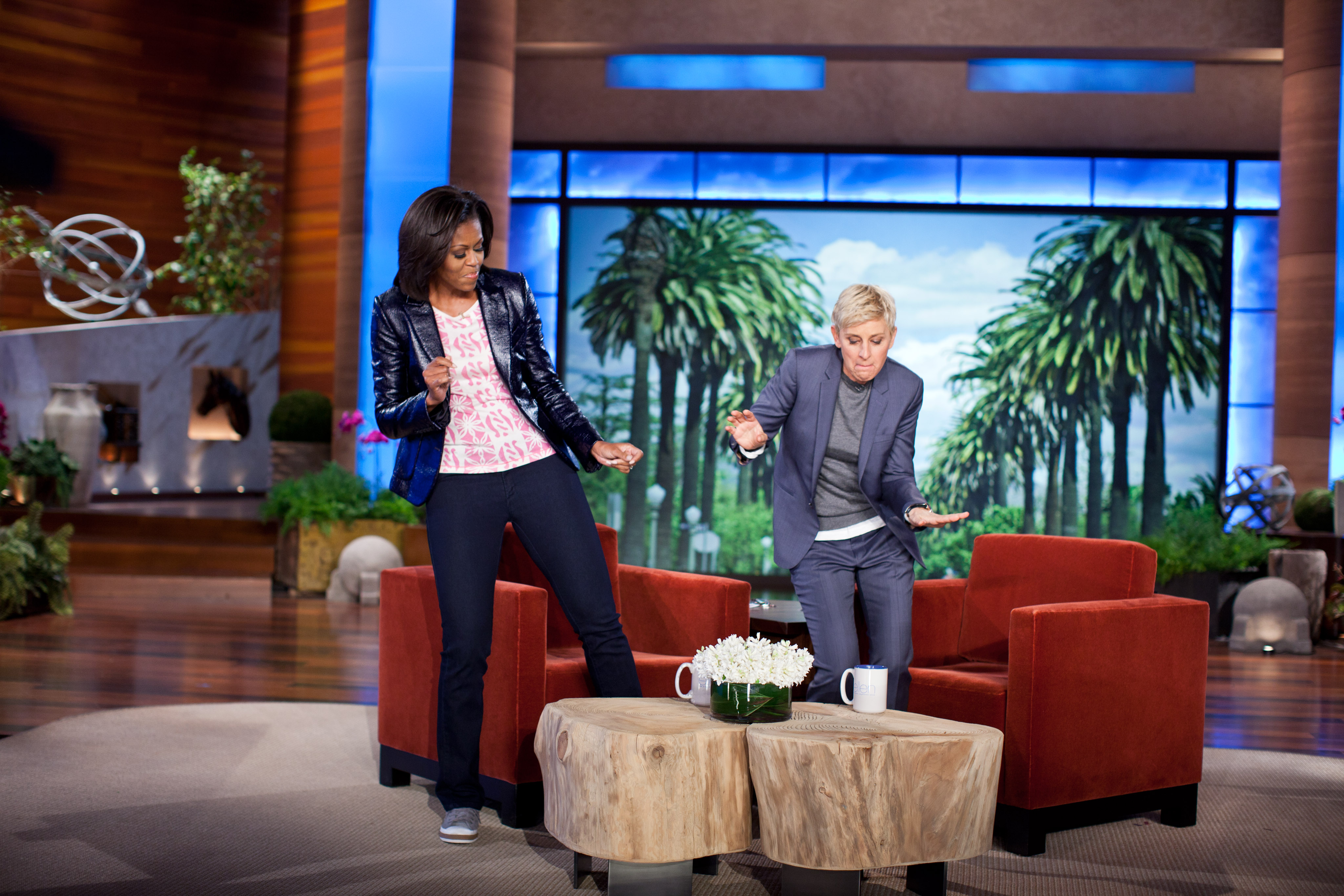
Michelle Obama and Ellen dance on the second anniversary of Let's Move!.

Since the show's debut, DeGeneres has segued from her opening monologue by doing a dance. The dancing proved to be extremely popular with viewers, and has since progressed to a segment where DeGeneres dances into the audience, sometimes borrowing a coat or purse from someone's chair, and taking it with her. She has also featured a segment in which people teach her new dance moves.

One of her most famous dance moves is dancing over the table, where she straddles the coffee table and dances from one end to the other. Although she does not do it every day, dancing over the table is a recurring theme. As an April Fools' Day prank in 2009, the show's staff placed a wider table top over her normal table. During the show, when DeGeneres attempted to dance over it, she barely made it across, being forced on her tip-toes and using the table as leverage. On the seventh-season premiere, DeGeneres performed a dance segment with the cast of So You Think You Can Dance.

In September 2009, four major record labels sued the producers of the show for unspecified damages over the dance routine, for allegedly using songs without permission.

In 2018, The New York Times profiled DeGeneres as she faced decisions of renewing her talkshow contract, and exploring other outlets for her creativity including her Netflix comedy special Relatable (2018), which spoofs her kind image. They noted that she felt boxed in with a reputation of always being nice, and the host who danced all time. DeGeneres—who acknowledges she has always been over-sensitive—fretted how her audience would react when she no longer wanted to dance. Her Christian Scientist upbringing included her father's psyche, "He was a very fearful man, he couldn't hear or engage with anything unpleasant."

==== Sophia Grace and Rosie ====
Sophia Grace Brownlee (born April 18, 2003) and her cousin Rosie McClelland (born September 7, 2006) were first invited to the show after DeGeneres saw their YouTube video cover of "Super Bass" by Nicki Minaj, which Sophia Grace and Rosie posted on YouTube on September 19, 2011. The then eight and five-year-old Essex, England natives became recurring cast members on the show, where they hosted their own segment called "Tea Time with Sophia Grace and Rosie". In the segment, the duo invite and interview guest celebrities such as Taylor Swift, Katy Perry, Hugh Grant, Julie Bowen, Harry Connick Jr., LL Cool J, Justin Bieber, and Reese Witherspoon over to tea. Sophia Grace and Rosie won the "Choice Webstar" at the 2012 Teen Choice Awards for this segment. They have also been correspondents during red carpet events such as the Grammy Awards, the American Music Awards, the Billboard Music Awards, and the MTV Video Music Awards. They appeared in the third episode (June 2013) and the eleventh episode (September 2013) of Sam & Cat. According to her representative, Sophia Grace had been cast as Little Red Riding Hood in Walt Disney Pictures' film adaptation of Stephen Sondheim's Into the Woods, but she withdrew before production. Sophia Grace and Rosie starred in their own movie called Sophia Grace and Rosie's Royal Adventure.

== Production information ==
=== Taping location ===
From 2003 to early 2008, the program was originally taped in Studio 11 at NBC Studios in Burbank, California. It was then filmed in Studio 1 (named "The Ellen Stage" since her 2,000th show, which took place in November 2015) on the Warner Bros. lot in Burbank.

=== Personnel ===
The executive producers were DeGeneres, Mary Connelly, Ed Glavin, Andy Lassner, and (until his death in 2012) Jim Paratore. The writing staff has included Karen Kilgariff (former head writer), Karen Anderson, Margaret Smith, and DeGeneres. Margaret Smith left the show to work on her own projects, including her first book, What Was I Thinking? How Being a Stand Up Did Nothing to Prepare Me to Become a Single Mother (Crossroad Publishing, 2008). Amy Rhodes, a former writer for the program, regularly appeared on camera during various segments.

==== DJ ====
Unlike most talk shows, the show used a disc jockey to supply music rather than a band. Originally, the role was filled by Los Angeles-based DJ Scott K, who lasted only a few weeks. He was later replaced by Tony Okungbowa, who DJed through season 3. Due to his growing acting career, Okungbowa left the show, and a few guest DJs were brought in to try out for the position. Tony was replaced by actor/DJ Jon Abrahams for the fourth-season premiere. Abrahams stayed on the show for one season, and also left as his acting career grew. Ted Stryker of KROQ, was the DJ for the fifth season. Stryker stayed for one season until Okungbowa returned. In a 2012 episode, DJ Pauly D from Jersey Shore deejayed when Okungbowa was promoting his CD.

Starting in season 11, several episodes include celebrity "guest DJs" filling the DJ position in Okungbowa's absence. Stephen "tWitch" Boss of So You Think You Can Dance fame had been Ellen's permanent DJ for several years. After the series completed in 2022, Stephen "tWitch" Boss died on December 13, 2022.

Okungbowa made a return appearance on the show in the April 28, 2014, episode, while Loni Love made a return in the June 5, 2015, episode.

=== 2007 Writers Guild strike ===
DeGeneres, a member of the Writers Guild of America, supported the 2007 writers' strike. However, on November 9, 2007, DeGeneres crossed the picket line to tape more episodes of her TV show stating:

It was explained to me that no other daytime shows have shut down. I've got 135 employees that rely on me for a paycheck. But it's been the hardest thing in the world driving onto this lot.

DeGeneres decided to abstain from doing a monologue on her show (which is typically written by WGA writers) during the strike. Her show continued production as normal with the exception of her monologue being omitted. The WGAE issued a statement condemning DeGeneres, stating she was "not welcome in NY." DeGeneres's representatives asserted that she did not violate the WGA's agreement, arguing that she is competing with other first-run syndicated shows like Dr. Phil and Live with Regis and Kelly during the competitive November sweeps period, and that DeGeneres must fulfill her duties as host and producer, lest her show lose its time slot or be held in breach of contract. In addition, a statement defending DeGeneres was subsequently issued by AFTRA, pointing out that DeGeneres also works under the AFTRA TV Code, which bars her from striking. The WGAE then issued a response pointing out that DeGeneres is also a Writers Guild member, and that any writing work she did on her show during the strike constituted struck work.

=== COVID-19 pandemic ===
On March 11, 2020, DeGeneres announced via Twitter that for now she would be shooting her show without a studio audience to protect the health and safety of the fans, staff, and crew. In a tweet dated March 13, 2020, DeGeneres announced that production of the show had been suspended until March 30, 2020, to protect the health of her audience and staff during the COVID-19 pandemic. Starting on April 6, 2020, the show was produced from her own home.

On April 16, 2020, Variety reported that crew members had accused the show of not communicating about their pay during the pandemic-induced shutdown.

For the 18th-season premiere, DeGeneres returned to the studio with a virtual audience, and a 6-foot table between DeGeneres and her guests.

For the 19th-season premiere, the live audience returned wearing masks. By the end of the season, masks were optional.

=== Controversy over work culture ===
In 2018, The New York Times profiled DeGeneres as she faced decisions of renewing her talk show contract, and exploring other outlets for her creativity including her Netflix comedy special Relatable (2018), which spoofed her public image. When asked about anonymous tabloid reports that she is not always nice to her workers, she said the accusations were false, saying "The one thing I want is for everyone to be happy and proud of where they work, and if not, don't work here."

In July 2020, BuzzFeed News ran articles in which anonymous former employees accused the show of being a toxic workplace, accused the executive producers of harassment, as well as alleging an atmosphere with racist comments and microaggressions. WarnerMedia began an investigation. DeGeneres apologized to her staff, writing that "she intended for her show to be a place where 'no one would ever raise their voice, and everyone would be treated with respect' and that she was 'disappointed to learn that this has not been the case.'" Following the investigation, three executives were fired, executive producers Ed Glavin and Kevin Leman, and co-executive producer Jonathan Norman. The show vowed to take steps to change the culture; DeGeneres apologized again during the eighteenth season's September 2020 opening. Her DJ, Stephen "tWitch" Boss, was promoted to co-executive producer and served as host of the show filling in for her.

=== Ending ===
On May 12, 2021, shortly after the controversy, DeGeneres confirmed that the show would conclude at the end of the 2021–22 season, the show's nineteenth, coinciding with the end of her current contract. Warner Bros. was not initially expected to offer a direct replacement program, and lead carrier NBC Owned Television Stations announced it would move The Kelly Clarkson Show, which is produced by sister company NBCUniversal Syndication Studios, into the Ellen timeslot on its stations. Other stations made individual decisions about replacement programming, which included additional local newscasts; a few stations indicated interest in the possibility of a show hosted by frequent Ellen fill-in host Tiffany Haddish, but no such program was ever announced.

On March 17, 2022, Warner Bros. announced that the final original episode hosted by DeGeneres would air on May 26; the final episode was recorded on April 28. The studio added that new episodes with guest hosts would air, alongside repeats and compilations, through September 9.

In November 2021, Deadline reported that Warner Bros. was in discussions with local station groups about a potential new daytime talk show hosted by Jennifer Hudson which could have debuted as early as fall 2022 and which the studio foresaw as a "successor" to Ellen, notwithstanding the prior announcement by the NBC-owned stations. WB subsequently announced The Jennifer Hudson Show would debut in fall 2022, with Fox Television Stations and Hearst Television as its lead carriers.

The show's final episode, which featured appearances by Jennifer Aniston, Billie Eilish and Pink, aired as scheduled on May 26, 2022.

== Episodes ==
During the course of the series, 3,296 episodes of The Ellen DeGeneres Show aired over nineteen seasons, between September 8, 2003, and June 3, 2022.

Season	Episodes	Originally released	
Season	Episodes	First released	Last released
1	166	September 8, 2003	May 28, 2004
2	180	September 6, 2004	June 10, 2005
3	170	September 5, 2005	June 2, 2006
4	171	September 4, 2006	May 30, 2007
5	150	September 4, 2007	May 1, 2008
6	172	September 8, 2008	June 5, 2009
7	173	September 7, 2009	May 28, 2010
8	171	September 13, 2010	June 1, 2011
9	171	September 12, 2011	May 30, 2012
10	168 + 2 sp.	September 10, 2012	June 13, 2013
11	168 + 2 sp.	September 9, 2013	June 3, 2014
12	170 + 4 sp.	September 8, 2014	June 12, 2015
13	177	September 8, 2015	June 17, 2016
14	171 + 3 sp.	September 6, 2016	June 9, 2017
15	177 + 8 sp.	September 5, 2017	August 31, 2018
16	189	September 4, 2018	June 28, 2019
17	188	September 6, 2019	July 9, 2020
18	185	September 21, 2020	July 9, 2021
19	181 + 10 sp.	September 13, 2021	June 3, 2022

=== Special episodes ===
Several episodes have aired with a special theme or format, including a "Backwards Show", entire episodes themed around Broadway productions, a Thanksgiving special taped in the Ed Sullivan Theater in New York City, an entire episode which included Deltalina filmed on a Delta airplane, her 12 Days of Giveaways shows and Ellen's Birthday Show. Other recurring themes feature products from sponsors DeGeneres likes (similar to Oprah's Favorite Things from the now ended The Oprah Winfrey Show), specials following awards show telecasts (such as the Academy Awards), and numerous milestone episodes (e.g., DeGeneres's 1,000th, 1,300th, 1,500th, etc. broadcasts). In 2017, an episode aired commemorating the 20th anniversary of "The Puppy Episode", the episode of her sitcom Ellen, in which her character Ellen Morgan came out as a lesbian.

The episode titled "Sirdeaner Walker Interview" was nominated for a GLAAD Media Award for "Outstanding Talk Show Episode" during the 21st GLAAD Media Awards.

On January 11, 2013, DeGeneres announced that she was going to Australia in March with her wife, Australian actress Portia de Rossi, after having wanted to go for many years, being unable to visit in summer (which she preferred) due to taping conflicts of her show. Toward the end of the episode, which featured Nicole Kidman as a guest, she announced to the audience that they will also be going on a holiday to Australia in a giveaway special.

On March 3, 2014, DeGeneres hosted the show live, one day after her being the host of the 86th Academy Awards. This episode features that year's Oscar winners Cate Blanchett, Jared Leto, and Lupita Nyong'o as guests.

=== Guest hosts ===
From time to time a guest host filled in for DeGeneres. This was previously quite rare, but gradually became more common, especially in the final seasons, and was considered a regular part of the show.

- Ellie Kemper filled in to be the first guest host on the show on January 24, 2014, as DeGeneres was unable to host the show due to having the flu. Kemper hosted for a second time on December 14, 2018. She hosted for a third time on December 23, 2019.
- Miley Cyrus hosted on September 29, 2016, which was also day four of the 7th Annual Cat Week, as DeGeneres was sick.
- Sean Hayes hosted on May 30, 2018 while DeGeneres was in Africa visiting the gorillas in Rwanda to help with the Ellen DeGeneres Wildlife Camp. He hosted for a second time on October 4, 2019. He hosted for a third time on October 18, 2019. He hosted for a fourth time on January 31, 2020. He hosted for a fifth time on February 28, 2020. He hosted for a sixth time on March 13, 2020. He hosted for a seventh time on March 30, 2020.
- Kristen Bell hosted on May 31, 2018 while DeGeneres was in Africa.
- Lea Michele hosted the last episode of Season 15 on August 29, 2018. This was DeGeneres' gift to Michele, whose birthday was on the day of the taping.
- Mario Lopez hosted two bonus episodes (that aired after the Lea Michele episode), on August 30, 2018, and August 31, 2018. He hosted for a third time on January 29, 2021. He hosted for a fourth time on March 29, 2021. He hosted for a fifth time on October 14, 2021. He hosted for a sixth time on October 15, 2021. He hosted for a seventh time on February 4, 2022. He hosted for an eighth time on February 25, 2022. He hosted for a ninth time on April 15, 2022. He hosted for a tenth time on April 21, 2022.
- Goldie Hawn and Kate Hudson hosted on January 17, 2019.
- Jason Sudeikis hosted on March 15, 2019. He hosted for a second time on June 12, 2019.
- Mila Kunis hosted on April 11, 2019.
- John Cena hosted on April 19, 2019.
- Melissa McCarthy hosted on May 16, 2019.
- DeGeneres' DJ tWitch hosted the episode that aired May 23, 2019. (It was likely filmed at an earlier date as a clip was posted online three weeks earlier, on May 3, 2019, showing a segment where he interviewed Kunal Nayyar.) tWitch hosted for a second time on September 6, 2019. He then hosted the show on September 25, 2020, October 2, 2020, October 11, 2019, October 24, 2019, October 26, 2020, January 15, 2021, February 12, 2021, March 5, 2021, March 19, 2021, March 26, 2021, March 31, 2021, April 1, 2021, April 9, 2021, June 8, 2021, June 14, 2021, June 17, 2021, June 18, 2021, June 25, 2021, July 2, 2021, July 5, 2021, July 8, 2021, July 9, 2021, October 8, 2021, November 12, 2021, December 10, 2021, December 23, 2021, December 28, 2021, January 7, 2022, February 18, 2022, March 10, 2022, March 18, 2022, April 14, 2022, with Tiffany Haddish, April 22, 2022, April 29, 2022, and June 3, 2022, with Dwyane Wade. In total, he has hosted the show thirty-seven times.
- Wanda Sykes hosted on May 29, 2019. She hosted for a second time on June 30, 2021.
- Dax Shepard hosted on September 19, 2019.
- Beth Behrs hosted on September 26, 2019, with Whitney Cummings. She hosted for a second time on July 6, 2021.
- Justin Hartley hosted on October 25, 2019.
- Howie Mandel hosted on October 29, 2019. He hosted for a second time on March 1, 2021. He hosted for a third time on April 2, 2021. He hosted for a fourth time on December 17, 2021. He hosted for a fifth time on December 20, 2021.
- Ken Jeong hosted on November 8, 2019.
- John Legend hosted on November 15, 2019. He hosted for a second time on February 14, 2020.
- Josh Gad hosted on November 22, 2019.
- Eugene Levy and Dan Levy hosted on January 10, 2020.
- Robert Downey Jr. hosted on January 14, 2020.
- Jane Fonda and Lily Tomlin hosted on January 17, 2020.
- Jennifer Aniston hosted on January 24, 2020. Aniston was the first guest ever on the show; she had previously co-hosted with DeGeneres several years ago, but this was her first time solo hosting.
- Martha Stewart and Snoop Dogg hosted on February 7, 2020.
- Demi Lovato hosted on March 6, 2020.
- Alec Baldwin hosted on March 23, 2020.
- Tiffany Haddish hosted on October 9, 2020. She hosted for a second time on October 19, 2020. She hosted for a third time on November 20, 2020. She hosted for a fourth time on February 19, 2021. She hosted for a fifth time on February 26, 2021. She hosted for a sixth time on April 16, 2021. She hosted for a seventh time on June 28, 2021. She hosted for an eighth time on October 22, 2021. She hosted for a ninth time on November 5, 2021. She hosted for a tenth time on April 14, 2022, alongside tWitch. She hosted for an eleventh time on May 6, 2022.
- Sarah Silverman hosted on November 9, 2020.
- Garth Brooks hosted on November 13, 2020, He hosted for a second time with wife Trisha Yearwood on May 28, 2021.
- Brooke Baldwin hosted on March 12, 2021.
- Kalen Allen hosted on March 31, 2021.
- Ashley Graham hosted on April 23, 2021.
- Anthony Anderson hosted on April 30, 2021.
- Rob Lowe hosted on May 21, 2021.
- Trisha Yearwood hosted on May 28, 2021, alongside her husband Garth Brooks.
- Chelsea Handler hosted on June 29, 2021. She hosted for a second time on July 1, 2021.
- Loni Love hosted on July 7, 2021.
- Arsenio Hall hosted on September 24, 2021. He hosted for a second time on October 1, 2021.
- Katy Perry hosted on October 25, 2021.
- Yvonne Orji hosted on November 19, 2021.
- Leslie Jordan hosted on December 21, 2021.
- JoJo Siwa hosted on December 22, 2021. She hosted for a second time on December 27, 2021.
- Brad Paisley hosted on December 29, 2021.
- Ciara hosted on December 30, 2021. She hosted for a second time on March 4, 2022.
- Adam DeVine hosted on January 14, 2022. He hosted for a second time on January 21, 2022.
- Mickey Guyton hosted on March 3, 2022.
- Julie Bowen hosted on March 11, 2022.
- Leslie Jones hosted on March 25, 2022. She hosted for a second time on May 31, 2022.
- Brandi Carlile hosted on April 1, 2022.
- Kandi Burruss hosted on April 8, 2022.
- Tig Notaro hosted on June 1, 2022.
- Dwyane Wade hosted on June 2, 2022. He hosted for a second time on June 3, 2022, alongside tWitch.

=== Guest co-hosts ===
DeGeneres has also occasionally co-hosted the show with guest co-hosts, which have included:

- Matthew Perry (on April 19, 2013)
- Jennifer Aniston (on May 22, 2013; also partially co-hosted on June 5, 2019, and discussed guest hosting in the future)
- Julia Roberts (on December 18, 2013)
- Jason Bateman (on March 24, 2014)
- Rob Lowe (on April 9, 2014)
- Dallas Austin (on May 7, 2014)
- Michelle Obama (on September 13, 2016)
- Kristen Bell (on September 20, 2016)
- Kevin Hart (on October 11, 2016)
- Ciara (on October 5, 2018)
- Chrissy Teigen (on November 20, 2018)
- Ashton Kutcher (on December 11, 2018)
- Mila Kunis (on September 28, 2021)

=== International broadcasts ===
At its peak, the show was internationally syndicated to more than 18 channels across 15 countries. The show currently still airs on ITV2 in the United Kingdom, RTÉ in Ireland, SIC Caras in Portugal, and on OSN Comedy in the Middle East.

== Home media ==
A best-of DVD titled The Ellen DeGeneres Show: DVD-Licious was released in 2006, featuring early footage from the first few seasons.

== Social media ==
The show is active on a number of social media platforms, including Twitter, where DeGeneres has over 70 million followers, Instagram, Facebook, Snapchat, TikTok, and more. The talk show's YouTube channel is in the top 50 most-subscribed YouTube channels.

As of December 31, 2022, the talk show's YouTube channel has 38.3 million subscribers and about 23 billion total views.

On January 1, 2023, all of DeGeneres' social media platform handles were changed from @TheEllenShow to @EllenDeGeneres. The YouTube channel still remains as "TheEllenShow".

== Reception ==
The show was met with considerable success, and won 63 Daytime Emmy Awards by 2022. Additionally, as the show's popularity increased, the program appeared as a plot element in the storylines of several scripted television programs, including Joey, Six Feet Under, and The Bernie Mac Show.

=== Ratings ===
The show averaged around 4.2+ million daily viewers per episode, according to syndicated daytime television ratings, making it a highly viewed daytime show. It usually only trails behind Live with Kelly and Ryan, and Dr. Phil in total viewers. In 2017, the show passed Live with Kelly and Ryan for the first time and trailed behind Dr. Phil. Following the toxic workplace allegations, the show saw a decline in viewership with a drop of up to over a million viewers in ratings.

=== Awards ===
The show has won a total of 63 Daytime Emmy Awards by 2022, including four for Outstanding Talk Show (2004, 2005, 2006, 2007) and seven for Outstanding Talk Show Entertainment (2010, 2011, 2013, 2014, 2015, 2017, 2019 and 2020). The show's first fourteen seasons surpassed the record held by The Oprah Winfrey Show, which received 47 Daytime Emmy Awards before Winfrey chose to stop submitting it for consideration in 2000. DeGeneres herself has won the Daytime Emmy Award for Outstanding Talk Show Host four times (2005, 2006, 2007, 2008). The show has also won 48 Daytime Emmys in Writing (10 total), Directing (6 total), and Technical Categories (32 total). It won the Genesis Award for "Best Talk Show" in 2010 and 2012. DeGeneres has won the People's Choice Award for "Favorite Daytime TV Host" 15 times, making her the most awarded person in the People's Choice Awards's history.

At the 2018 Webby Awards, Heads Up! A Party Game from Ellen!, a video game for iOS and Android, won the People's Voice Award for "Word & Trivia".

== Spin-offs ==
=== Ellen's Game of Games ===
In 2017, NBC premiered Ellen's Game of Games, a primetime game show built around the audience game segments from the show.

=== Ellen's Greatest Night of Giveaways ===
In December 2019, NBC aired a three-night event series spun off from the "12 Days of Giveaways", Ellen's Greatest Night of Giveaways, which featured DeGeneres collaborating with notable celebrities and public figures to "deliver incredible gifts to unsuspecting people".

=== The Masked Dancer ===
After it was performed on The Ellen DeGeneres Show as a spoof of The Masked Singer, Fox's head of alternative entertainment Rob Wade contacted the show's producers about the possibility of working on The Masked Dancer as a full spin-off series. DeGeneres would be named executive producer of the series as well; Wade stated that although they did not necessarily need her for the series, he felt that DeGeneres was "passionate about it" and had good "access to celebrities".

=== Family Game Fight! ===
In March 2021, NBC announced a spin-off game show titled Family Game Fight!, with Kristen Bell and Dax Shepard as hosts and a 10-episode run has been ordered. In May 2021, it was announced that the series would premiere on August 11, 2021. In July 2021, it was announced that the series would premiere on August 8, 2021, after its primetime airing of the 2020 Summer Olympics closing ceremony replacing Ultimate Slip 'N Slide.

== International versions ==
Country/language	Local title	Host	Channel	Date aired/premiered
Ukraine	Olia	Olha Freimut	Novyi Kanal	August 28, 2018
Thailand	Woody	Woody Milintachinda	Channel 7	November 3, 2020
