= Bob Harper (producer) =

American film producer (born 1955)

- Born: Robert Everett Harper; March 24, 1955 (age 71); Washington, D.C.
- Citizenship: US
- Education: Carnegie Mellon University
- Occupation: Film producer

Robert Everett "Bob" Harper (born March 24, 1955) is an American film producer. In a Hollywood career spanning 30 years, he has marketed over 400 films including Titanic, Mr. and Mrs. Smith, Planet of the Apes, X-Men, the Star Wars trilogy and Home Alone, and collaborated with some of the most influential directors of the past twenty-five years, including George Lucas, Steven Spielberg, James Cameron and Tim Burton.

== Career ==
Harper was born and raised in Washington D.C. He served as general manager at Kaleidoscope Films from 1980 to 1985. He joined 20th Century Fox in 1986, working on trailers and creative advertising before becoming president of domestic marketing in 1989. He later served as a producer for Fox, developing and producing the 1993 hit comedy Rookie of the Year. Returning to Fox in 1995, Harper was president of worldwide marketing, vice chairman of 20th Century Fox, executive vice president of parent company Fox Filmed Entertainment, and vice chairman of Fox Filmed Entertainment.

Harper was chairman and chief executive officer of Fox-based production and distribution company New Regency Productions from 2007 until 2011. He executive produced the films What's Your Number?, In Time, and The Darkest Hour.

== Externals ==
- Bob Harper at IMDb
