= Steve Spangler =

American television presenter, author and science teacher

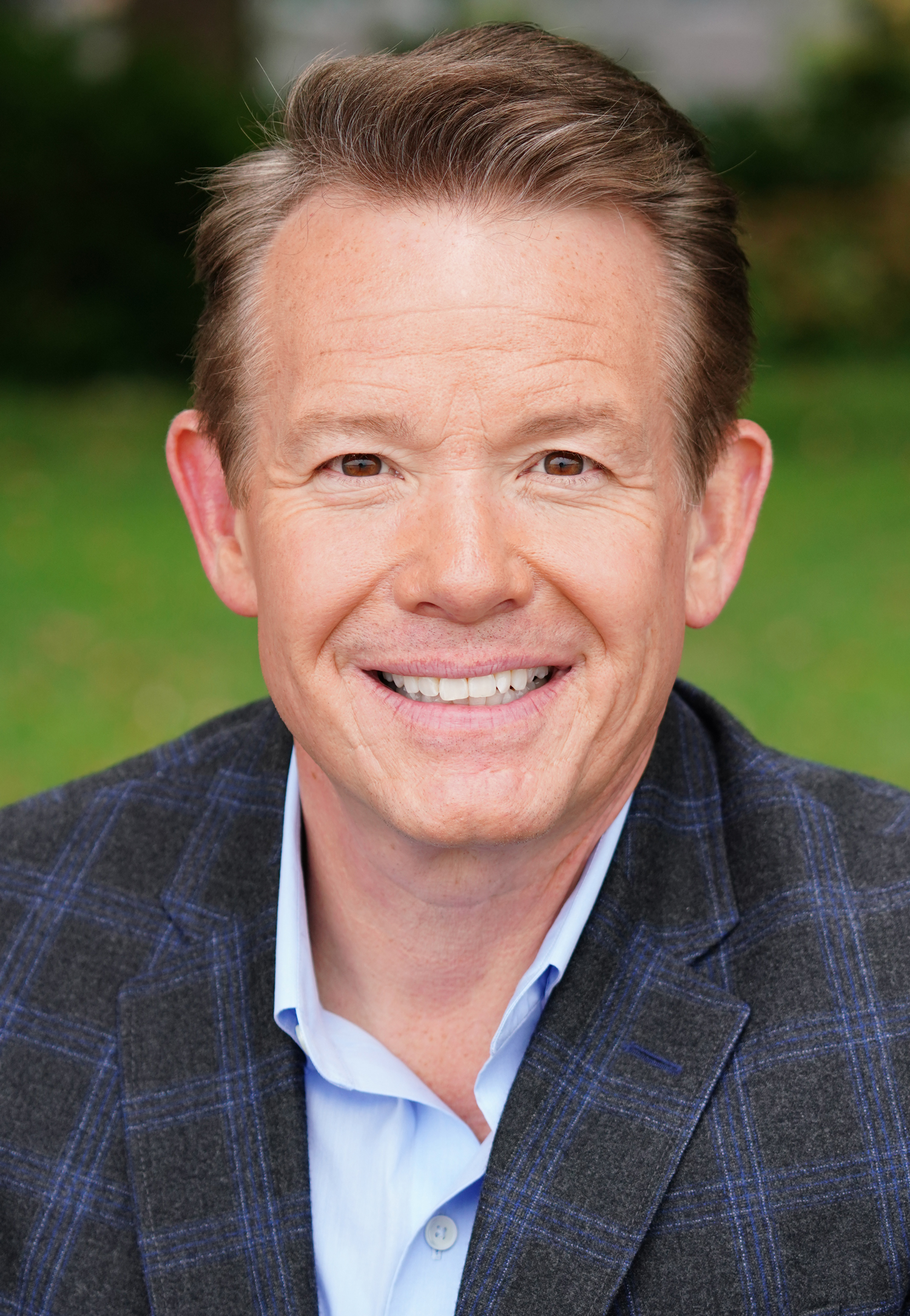
- Spangler in 2019
- Born: Denver, Colorado, U.S.
- Occupations: Television personality Author; Science teacher
- Known for: Television host DIY Sci; YouTube personality
- Website: https://stevespangler.com/

Steve Spangler is an American television personality, author and STEM teacher. He was the CEO of Steve Spangler Science until 2018 when the company was sold to Really Good Stuff, LLC, a division of Excelligence Learning Corporation. Spangler posted the first Diet Coke and Mentos video on YouTube in September 2005 and his 2002 televised demonstration of the eruption went viral, launching a chain of several other Diet Coke and Mentos experiment viral videos. He earned two Heartland Emmy Awards and a total of five Emmy nominations. Spangler is an inductee of the National Speakers Association Speaker Hall of Fame.

== Career ==
=== Education work ===
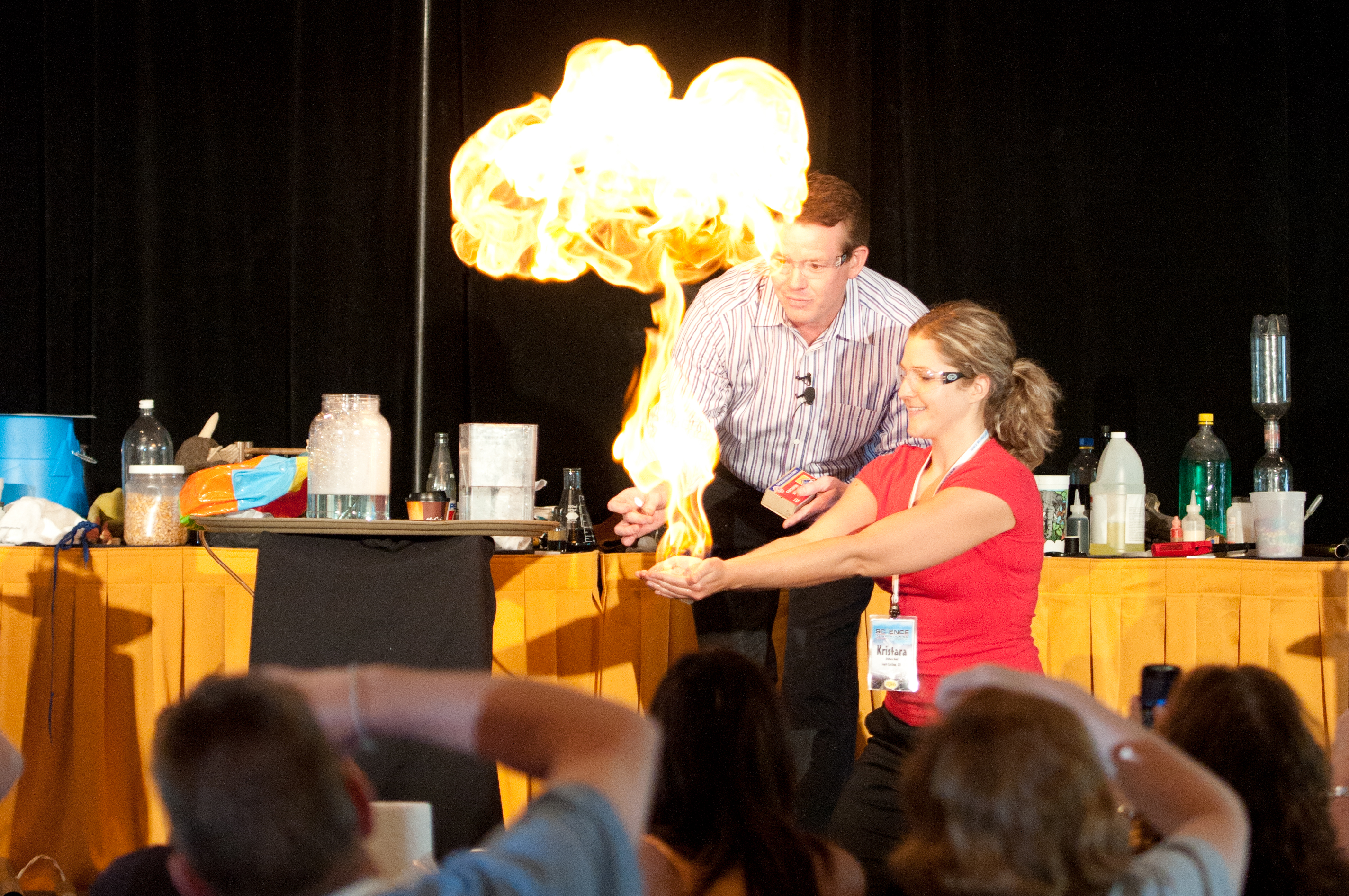
Steve Spangler igniting methane-filled bubbles in the hands of a young teacher at Science in the Rockies 2011.

Spangler's career began as a science teacher in the Cherry Creek School District in Colorado.

In 1992, Spangler began working as an adjunct faculty member at the Regis University in the Department of Chemistry. He was the Executive Director of the National Hands-on Science Institute until 2001.

=== Television work ===
During his first year of teaching, a producer from the Denver, Colorado NBC affiliate KCNC-TV offered Spangler a position as a science host on News for Kids after seeing him perform a science demonstration show at a public event. News for Kids premiered in 1991 and was picked up for national syndication in 1993, airing in 185 cities every Saturday morning. After six seasons, Spangler produced 220 segments that featured simple science experiments that viewers could easily recreate at home.

In 2001, Spangler joined the Denver NBC affiliate, KUSA-TV 9NEWS as their Science Education Contributor.

The Diet Coke and Mentos eruption experiment was first televised by Spangler in 2002 and became popular on the Internet in 2005. More than a thousand videos appeared online replicating the experiment. Spangler was nominated for the Time 100 in 2007 because of the experiment. He signed a licensing agreement with Perfetti Van Melle, the maker of MENTOS, in 2006 and developed a line of toys to be used with the experiment.

=== Other work ===
Spangler is the author of seven books: Down to a Science, Taming the Tornado Tube, Bounce No Bounce, Fizz Factor, Secret Science, Naked Eggs and Flying Potatoes, Fire Bubbles and Exploding Toothpaste.

Spangler also runs the Sick Science! YouTube channel and a TikTok account.

== Awards ==
Spangler received a Heartland Emmy Award in 1997 for his contribution the television program News for Kids. In 2010, he received a Heartland Emmy Award for Spangler Science - Weather and Science Day at Coors Field. Spangler also received a Guinness World Record for the largest physics lesson.

Spangler was inducted into the National Speakers Association's Speaker Hall of Fame in 2010.

In October 2011, Spangler was selected as one of 100 initial partners for the YouTube Original Channel Initiative and received funding for the production of new original programming. Spangler's YouTube show, The Spangler Effect, debuted February 1, 2012.

== Personal life ==
Steve Spangler was born in Denver, Colorado. He graduated from the University of Colorado Boulder with a dual degree in chemistry and humanities in 1989. Spangler has three sons.
