= Kate Walsh (singer) =

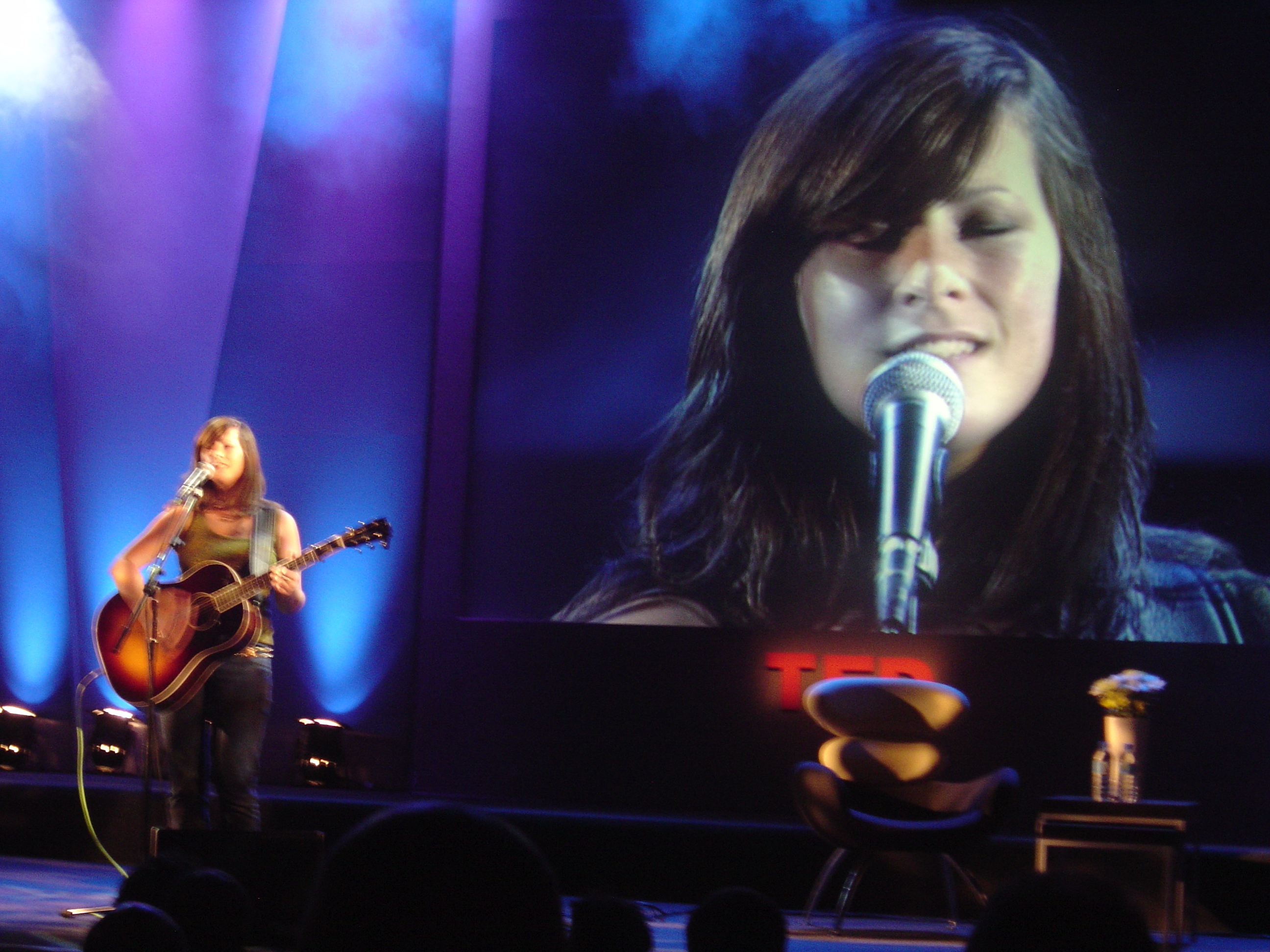
- Kate Walsh at a conference in England, 2005

Background information
- Born: 20 February 1983 (age 43); United Kingdom
- Origin: Burnham-on-Crouch, Essex, England
- Genres: Folk, acoustic
- Occupation: Singer-songwriter
- Instruments: Vocals, guitar, piano
- Years active: 2003–2012, 2025-present
- Labels: Kitchenware; Universal; Blueberry Pie (2007)

Kate Walsh (born 20 February 1983) is an English singer from Burnham-on-Crouch, Essex, England.

== Life ==
Walsh was born in the Essex town Burnham-on-Crouch. A graduate of the Brighton Institute of Modern Music, she released her first album, Clocktower Park (produced by Lee Russell), in 2003 through Kitchenware Records. The album was named after a meeting place in her home town. In 2007, she released her second album, Tim's House. It quickly became the No. 1 album on the UK iTunes Store. The album also features her most popular song, "Your Song". She gained iTunes customers' attention when her song "Talk of the Town" became the iTunes Free Single of the Week from the week beginning 20 March 2007.

Her third studio album, Light and Dark, was released in the UK on 31 August 2009. The lead single from the record, "June Last Year", was released on 24 August. She began her UK tour at the end of September that year.

Her single "Your Song" was featured in the 2008 film Angus, Thongs and Perfect Snogging as well the 2008 film The Crew, the 2010 film The Decoy Bride, and on the TV show Grey's Anatomy. In 2011, she discussed the release of her newest album The Real Thing and her tour.

On 5 September 2012, she announced on her Facebook page that she would be taking an indefinite hiatus from her music career to do something else: "By taking time out and putting some distance between me and my songs I am now, for the first time, able to start letting go of the past and can begin to move forward in a new and exciting direction".

After becoming a piano teacher and raising a family she returned to performance with new songs. She agreed to play at St Matthias' Church, Stoke Newington in November 2025.

== Discography ==
=== Studio albums ===
| Year | Album details | UK |
|---|---|---|
| 2003 | Clocktower Park: Released: 23 October 2003; Label: Kitchenware (#32); Formats: CD, digital download | — |
| 2007 | Tim's House: Released: 26 March 2007; Label: Blueberry Pie (#01); Formats: CD, digital download; 1. "Your Song"; 2. "Talk of the Town"; 3. "Is This It?"; 4. "Don't Break My Heart"; 5. "Betty"; 6. "Bury My Head"; 7. "French Song"; 8. "Tonight"; 9. "Goldfish"; 10. "Fireworks" | 75 |
| 2009 | Light & Dark: Released: 31 August 2009; Label: Blueberry Pie (#02); Formats: CD, digital download | 158 |
| 2010 | Peppermint Radio: Released: 13 September 2010; Label: Blueberry Pie (#03); Formats: CD, digital download | — |
| 2011 | The Real Thing: Released: 21 November 2011; Label: Blueberry Pie (#10CD); Formats: CD, digital download | TBA |

=== Extended plays ===
| Year | Album details |
|---|---|
| 2007 | Live from London: Released: 2007; Label: Universal; Formats: CD |
| 2010 | 1,000 Bees: Released: 17 January 2010; Label: EMI UK |

=== Singles ===
| Year | Song | Album |
|---|---|---|
| 2007 | "Don't Break My Heart" | Tim's House |
| 2007 | "Your Song" | Tim's House |
| 2007 | "Tonight" | Tim's House |
| 2007 | "Your Song" (acoustic version) | Tim's House |
| 2008 | "Don't Break My Heart" (re-release) | Tim's House |
| 2012 | "When You Were Around" (with Dash Berlin) | #musicislife |
