= Blockhead =

Blockhead(s) may refer to:

== Films ==
- The Blockhead, a 1921 German silent film
- Block-Heads, a 1938 film starring Laurel and Hardy
- Blockhead (film), a 1966 Italian film

== Music ==
- Blockhead (music producer) (born 1976), American hip-hop producer
- Blockheads (French band), a French grindcore band
- The Blockheads, a UK rock band
- "Blockheads", a song by Ian Dury from New Boots and Panties!!
- "Blockhead", a song by Devo from Duty Now for the Future
- Fans of New Kids on the Block

== Other uses ==
- African blockhead cichlid or Lionhead cichlid, a fish
- Blockhead!, a block stacking game
- Blockheads (Gumby), a pair of fictional characters from the TV series Gumby
- Blockhead (thought experiment), also known as Blockhead argument
- "Blockheads" (Arrested Development), an episode of Arrested Development
- The Blockheads (video game), a handheld device game released in 2013
- Human Blockhead, a circus sideshow performer
- The name used for a character in the game Blockland
- Another name for the Harley-Davidson Evolution engine

== See also ==
- "Blockhead Hans", a fairy tale
- Peanuts, a comic strip by Charles M. Schulz that commonly uses the term "Blockhead" by the characters
- Thickhead (disambiguation)
