= The Ellen DeGeneres Show season 1 =

The Ellen DeGeneres Show
- Season 1
- Starring: Ellen DeGeneres
- No. of episodes: 166

Release
- Original release: September 8, 2003 – May 28, 2004

Season chronology
- Next → Season 2

This is a list of episodes for the first season of The Ellen DeGeneres Show, which aired from September 8, 2003 to May 28, 2004.

== Episodes ==
| No. overall | No. in season | Original release date | Guests |
|---|---|---|---|
| 1 | 1 | September 8, 2003 | Series Premiere, Jennifer Aniston, Macy Gray |
| 2 | 2 | September 9, 2003 | Justin Timberlake |
| 3 | 3 | September 10, 2003 | Betty White, Sherri Shepherd |
| 4 | 4 | September 11, 2003 | Megan Mullally |
| 5 | 5 | September 12, 2003 | Dennis Quaid, Lisa Marie Presley |
| 6 | 6 | September 15, 2003 | Sean Hayes, Nikki Reed |
| 7 | 7 | September 16, 2003 | Amanda Bynes, Sharon Stone, Thicke |
| 8 | 8 | September 17, 2003 | Jennifer Love Hewitt, John C. McGinley |
| 9 | 9 | September 18, 2003 | Peter Boyle, Eve |
| 10 | 10 | September 19, 2003 | Terry Bradshaw, Kim Cattrall, Seal |
| 11 | 11 | September 22, 2003 | Richard Simmons, Rena Sofer |
| 12 | 12 | September 23, 2003 | David Hyde Pierce, Kimberly Williams-Paisley, Liz Phair |
| 13 | 13 | September 24, 2003 | Allison Janney, Donnie Wahlberg |
| 14 | 14 | September 25, 2003 | Jason Biggs, Amber Valletta, Michelle Branch |
| 15 | 15 | September 26, 2003 | Ben Stiller, Pat Benatar |
| 16 | 16 | September 29, 2003 | Daryl Hannah, Kate Bosworth |
| 17 | 17 | September 30, 2003 | Danny DeVito, Faith Ford, Maroon 5 |
| 18 | 18 | October 1, 2003 | Kevin James, Dakota Fanning |
| 19 | 19 | October 2, 2003 | Noah Wyle, Bob Guiney, Elton John |
| 20 | 20 | October 3, 2003 | Dwayne “The Rock” Johnson, Brittany Snow |
| 21 | 21 | October 6, 2003 | Dean Cain, Bonnie Raitt |
| 22 | 22 | October 7, 2003 | Ted Danson, Loni Anderson |
| 23 | 23 | October 8, 2003 | Kevin Bacon, Phyllis Diller |
| 24 | 24 | October 9, 2003 | Bonnie Hunt, Lyle Lovett |
| 25 | 25 | October 10, 2003 | Jack Black, Wendie Malick, Dido |
| 26 | 26 | October 13, 2003 | Tom Arnold, Cloris Leachman |
| 27 | 27 | October 14, 2003 | Patricia Heaton, Carl Reiner |
| 28 | 28 | October 15, 2003 | Martin Short, Joely Fisher, Shelby Lynne |
| 29 | 29 | October 16, 2003 | Bradley Whitford, Dennis Haysbert, Eleanor Bralver |
| 30 | 30 | October 17, 2003 | Dylan McDermott, Teri Polo, Mýa |
| 31 | 31 | October 20, 2003 | David Alan Grier, Joan Cusack |
| 32 | 32 | October 21, 2003 | Jim Belushi, Mo'Nique, Joss Stone |
| 33 | 33 | October 22, 2003 | Charlie Sheen, Debra Jo Rupp, Anthony Hamilton |
| 34 | 34 | October 23, 2003 | Katie Holmes, Black Eyed Peas |
| 35 | 35 | October 24, 2003 | Tim Robbins, Annie Lennox |
| 36 | 36 | October 27, 2003 | Ellen's Bonus Hour |
| 37 | 37 | October 28, 2003 | Christina Applegate, Jeff Probst |
| 38 | 38 | October 29, 2003 | Alicia Silverstone, Anthony Anderson |
| 39 | 39 | October 30, 2003 | Cuba Gooding Jr., Jane Kaczmarek, R.E.M. |
| 40 | 40 | October 31, 2003 | Wanda Sykes, Joshua Molina |
| 41 | 41 | November 3, 2003 | Dr. Phil McGraw, Jason Priestley |
| 42 | 42 | November 4, 2003 | Kiefer Sutherland, Jane Leeves |
| 43 | 43 | November 5, 2003 | Jeff Bridges, Doris Roberts |
| 44 | 44 | November 6, 2003 | Bob Newhart, Clay Aiken |
| 45 | 45 | November 7, 2003 | Allison Janney, John Ratzenberger, Alexander Gould |
| 46 | 46 | November 10, 2003 | Kelsey Grammer, Will Ferrell |
| 47 | 47 | November 11, 2003 | Kathie Lee Gifford, Benjamin McKenzie, Earth, Wind & Fire |
| 48 | 48 | November 12, 2003 | Emma Thompson, George Lopez |
| 49 | 49 | November 13, 2003 | Steve Harvey, Rod Stewart |
| 50 | 50 | November 14, 2003 | Holly Hunter, Sarah McLachlan, Jeff Corwin |
| 51 | 51 | November 17, 2003 | Lauren Graham, Frankie Muniz |
| 52 | 52 | November 18, 2003 | Brendan Fraser, John Stamos |
| 53 | 53 | November 19, 2003 | Queen Latifah, Sheryl Crow |
| 54 | 54 | November 20, 2003 | Eric McCormack, Paul Walker |
| 55 | 55 | November 21, 2003 | Jenna Elfman, Cyndi Lauper |
| 56 | 56 | November 24, 2003 | Bernie Mac, Valerie Bertinelli |
| 57 | 57 | November 25, 2003 | Robert Downey Jr., Mary J. Blige |
| 58 | 58 | November 26, 2003 | Bette Midler, Bob Guiney |
| 59 | 59 | December 1, 2003 | Brad Garrett, Emily Procter |
| 60 | 60 | December 2, 2003 | Ron Howard, Toni Collette |
| 61 | 61 | December 3, 2003 | Courtney Thorne-Smith, Mark Feuerstein |
| 62 | 62 | December 4, 2003 | Jessica Lange, Josh Groban |
| 63 | 63 | December 5, 2003 | Katie Couric, Kelly Clarkson |
| 64 | 64 | December 8, 2003 | Gwyneth Paltrow, Alicia Keys |
| 65 | 65 | December 9, 2003 | Anthony Clark, Sara Gilbert, Pink |
| 66 | 66 | December 10, 2003 | Tom Cruise, Gloria Estefan |
| 67 | 67 | December 11, 2003 | Reba McEntire, Melana |
| 68 | 68 | December 12, 2003 | Diane Keaton, Paul Bettany |
| 69 | 69 | December 15, 2003 | Sting, Jamie Lee Curtis |
| 70 | 70 | December 16, 2003 | Shirley MacLaine, Enrique Iglesias |
| 71 | 71 | December 17, 2003 | Greg Kinnear, Kathy Baker, Nicole Richie |
| 72 | 72 | December 18, 2003 | Amanda Peet, Mekhi Phifer, Train |
| 73 | 73 | December 19, 2003 | Uma Thurman, Steve Harris, Al Green |
| 74 | 74 | January 5, 2004 | Steve Martin, Jon Cryer |
| 75 | 75 | January 6, 2004 | Elijah Wood, Terry Bradshaw |
| 76 | 76 | January 7, 2004 | Tracy Morgan, Tia Texada, Pete Yorn |
| 77 | 77 | January 8, 2004 | Mandy Moore, Michael Imperioli |
| 78 | 78 | January 9, 2004 | James Spader, Sherri Shepherd |
| 79 | 79 | January 12, 2004 | Anthony LaPaglia, Cheryl Hines |
| 80 | 80 | January 13, 2004 | Leah Remini, John Spencer |
| 81 | 81 | January 14, 2004 | Minnie Driver, Jason Bateman |
| 82 | 82 | January 15, 2004 | Debra Messing, Burt Bacharach, Ronald Isley |
| 83 | 83 | January 16, 2004 | Donny Osmond, Meredith Phillips |
| 84 | 84 | January 19, 2004 | Sean Astin, Breckin Meyer |
| 85 | 85 | January 20, 2004 | Richard Simmons, Randy Jackson |
| 86 | 86 | January 21, 2004 | Neve Campbell, Ruben Studdard |
| 87 | 87 | January 22, 2004 | Merv Griffin, Topher Grace |
| 88 | 88 | January 23, 2004 | Jessica Capshaw, The Thrills |
| 89 | 89 | January 26, 2004 | Kim Cattrall, Bobb'e J. Thompson |
| 90 | 90 | January 27, 2004 | Betty White, Amy Smart, Gavin DeGraw |
| 91 | 91 | January 28, 2004 | Burt Reynolds, Nick Cannon |
| 92 | 92 | January 29, 2004 | Ashton Kutcher, Deidre Hall, Travis |
| 93 | 93 | January 30, 2004 | Julie Bowen, Fefe Dobson |
| 94 | 94 | February 2, 2004 | Amy Brenneman and LeAnn Rimes |
| 95 | 95 | February 3, 2004 | Katey Sagal, Chris Harrison, Brian McKnight |
| 96 | 96 | February 4, 2004 | Seth Green, Tyra Banks |
| 97 | 97 | February 5, 2004 | Charlize Theron, Brooke Shields |
| 98 | 98 | February 6, 2004 | Diane Lane, Missy Elliott |
| 99 | 99 | February 9, 2004 | Naomi Watts, Shoshana Johnson, Five For Fighting |
| 100 | 100 | February 10, 2004 | 100th Episode Sting |
| 101 | 101 | February 11, 2004 | Simon Cowell, Annie Lennox, Keisha Castle-Hughes |
| 102 | 102 | February 12, 2004 | Britney Spears, Tom Cavanagh |
| 103 | 103 | February 13, 2004 | Ted Danson, Edie Falco, KC & the Sunshine Band |
| 104 | 104 | February 16, 2004 | Adam Sandler, Drew Barrymore, Rob Schneider |
| 105 | 105 | February 17, 2004 | Lauren Graham, William Hung, Melissa Etheridge |
| 106 | 106 | February 18, 2004 | Jane Kaczmarek, Jeff Probst |
| 107 | 107 | February 19, 2004 | Marg Helgenberger, J.C. Chasez, Kratt brothers |
| 108 | 108 | February 20, 2004 | Meg Ryan, Jason Lewis, The Indigo Girls |
| 109 | 109 | February 23, 2004 | Fab Five, Murphy Lee, Jeffrey Tambor |
| 110 | 110 | February 24, 2004 | Mischa Barton, Jim Belushi, Tom Jones |
| 111 | 111 | February 25, 2004 | Allison Janney, Liev Schreiber |
| 112 | 112 | February 26, 2004 | Ray Romano, Dee Dee Davis |
| 113 | 113 | February 27, 2004 | Donald Trump, Harry Connick Jr. |
| 114 | 114 | March 1, 2004 | James Caan, Peri Gilpin, Meredith Phillips |
| 115 | 115 | March 2, 2004 | Robin Williams, Juliette Lewis |
| 116 | 116 | March 3, 2004 | Prince, Brittany Murphy |
| 117 | 117 | March 8, 2004 | Gillian Anderson, Donald Faison, Russell Levering |
| 118 | 118 | March 15, 2004 | Kate Winslet, Marlo Thomas |
| 119 | 119 | March 16, 2004 | Jason Biggs, Paige Davis |
| 120 | 120 | March 17, 2004 | Angelina Jolie, Mark Ruffalo |
| 121 | 121 | March 18, 2004 | Jim Carrey, Jamie-Lynn DiScala |
| 122 | 122 | March 19, 2004 | Christina Aguilera, Molly Shannon |
| 123 | 123 | March 20, 2004 | Kirsten Dunst, Steven Weber, Shelby Lynne |
| 124 | 124 | March 23, 2004 | Sarah Michelle Gellar, Olivier Martinez, Brad Paisley |
| 125 | 125 | March 24, 2004 | Ben Affleck, Sara Rue |
| 126 | 126 | March 25, 2004 | Heath Ledger, Camryn Manheim, N.E.R.D. |
| 127 | 127 | March 26, 2004 | Tom Hanks, Jamie Oliver |
| 128 | 128 | March 29, 2004 | Roseanne Barr, Chicago, Rachel Dratch |
| 129 | 129 | March 30, 2004 | Michael Chiklis, Vivica A. Fox |
| 130 | 130 | March 31, 2004 | Jerry O'Connell, Raquel Castro, Jamie Oliver |
| 131 | 131 | April 1, 2004 | Penny Marshall, Tori Spelling, Van Hunt |
| 132 | 132 | April 2, 2004 | Kristin Davis, Esai Morales, Chaka Khan |
| 133 | 133 | April 5, 2004 | Jamie Foxx, Selma Blair, Adam Mesh |
| 134 | 134 | April 6, 2004 | Dwayne The Rock Johnson, Jami Gertz |
| 135 | 135 | April 7, 2004 | David Duchovny, Poppy Montgomery, Sarah Harmer |
| 136 | 136 | April 8, 2004 | Cedric the Entertainer, Anne Hathaway |
| 137 | 137 | April 9, 2004 | Jessica Simpson, Henry Winkler, Hugh Dancy |
| 138 | 138 | April 19, 2004 | Dennis Franz, Elisha Cuthbert |
| 139 | 139 | April 20, 2004 | Barry Manilow, Nia Vardalos |
| 140 | 140 | April 21, 2004 | Janet Jackson, David Arquette |
| 141 | 141 | April 22, 2004 | John Travolta, Goran Visnjic |
| 142 | 142 | April 23, 2004 | David Bowie, Tina Fey |
| 143 | 143 | April 26, 2004 | Isabella Rossellini, Debbie Reynolds, Bill Rancic |
| 144 | 144 | April 27, 2004 | Simon Baker, Cheri Oteri, Liz Phair |
| 145 | 145 | April 28, 2004 | Christopher Walken, Omar Edwards |
| 146 | 146 | April 29, 2004 | Jennifer Garner, Jamie Kennedy |
| 147 | 147 | April 30, 2004 | Rebecca Romijn-Stamos, Dakota Fanning |
| 148 | 148 | May 3, 2004 | Bill Cosby, Sarah Chalke, Hanson |
| 149 | 149 | May 4, 2004 | Mary Tyler Moore, Rosie Perez |
| 150 | 150 | May 5, 2004 | Jay Leno, Lorraine Bracco, Mario Winans, Loon |
| 151 | 151 | May 6, 2004 | Lindsay Lohan, Kevin Sorbo, Scott Hagwood |
| 152 | 152 | May 7, 2004 | Hugh Jackman, Al Roker, Mary J. Blige |
| 153 | 153 | May 10, 2004 | Christina Ricci, Josh Duhamel |
| 154 | 154 | May 11, 2004 | David Schwimmer, Gabrielle Union |
| 155 | 155 | May 12, 2004 | Patti LaBelle, Cynthia Nixon |
| 156 | 156 | May 13, 2004 | Patrick Stewart, Nigella Lawson, Usher |
| 157 | 157 | May 14, 2004 | Paula Abdul, Wilmer Valderrama |
| 158 | 158 | May 17, 2004 | David Spade, Vanessa Marcil, La Toya London |
| 159 | 159 | May 18, 2004 | Simon Cowell, Jorja Fox |
| 160 | 160 | May 19, 2004 | Dolly Parton, Jon Favreau |
| 161 | 161 | May 20, 2004 | Glenn Close, Andy Richter, Angie Stone |
| 162 | 162 | May 24, 2004 | Sean Hayes, Jake Gyllenhaal |
| 163 | 163 | May 25, 2004 | Antonio Banderas, Alanis Morissette |
| 164 | 164 | May 26, 2004 | Cameron Diaz, Avril Lavigne |
| 165 | 165 | May 27, 2004 | Halle Berry, Tom Selleck, Morris Day |
| 166 | 166 | May 28, 2004 | Kate Hudson, Julian McMahon |
