= Execution (1968 film) =

1968 film

- Directed by: Domenico Paolella
- Written by: Domenico Paolella; Giancarlo Zagni; Fernando Franchi
- Cinematography: Aldo Scavarda
- Music by: Lallo Gori
- Release date: August 1968
- Country: Italy
- Language: Italian

Execution is a 1968 Italian Spaghetti Western film directed by Domenico Paolella.

== Cast ==
- John Richardson: John Cooler / Bill Cooler
- Mimmo Palmara: Clint Clips (credited as Dick Palmer)
- Franco Giornelli: Captain Charlie
- Piero Vida: Burt
- Rita Klein: Carol
- Néstor Garay: Juarez
