= Sara Carlson =

American singer, songwriter and dancer

Sara Carlson is an American singer, songwriter and dancer. She has released three music albums and her songs have appeared in U.S. film and television. While starring on a top-rated TV show Al Paradise on Rai Uno (Rome, Italy), along with five other prime-time shows, she influenced a generation of post-disco dance, performing some of the most memorable dances of the era. She has appeared in over 25 U.S. and international commercials ranging from Dr. Pepper to Bacardi; three major motion pictures; iconic rock videos, including The Power Station's cover of the T. Rex classic "Get It On (Bang a Gong)" and Pat Benatar's "Love is a Battlefield"; and even had a recurring role as TJ on Guiding Light on CBS (USA). Her album Heartdance was released in 2012 and is available for download on iTunes.

== Early career ==
As a teenager, Carlson studied music and dance with many prominent musicians in New York City, including Finis Jhung, Betsy Haug, JoJo Smith, Frank Hatchett, Michael Owens, Michele Assaf, Rick Atwell, among others. During this time, she began professional work in commercials. Her first role was in a Dr Pepper Commercial, and she then signed a contract with Landslide Management.

Landslide sent her to a casting in New York for Al Paradise, a show based in Italy that was looking for a female dancer/singer where 700 females auditioned for that part. After multiple auditions for the director Antonello Falqui, the writer Michele Guardi and the producer Elena Balestri, she was invited to go to Italy for the show. In 2012, Carlson was quoted saying "To be honest, I did not want to go, but in some odd way I knew it was my destiny and that I had to go."

== Career ==
After Al Paradise (1984), Carlson remained in Italy and went on to feature as a dancer and singer in five other prime-time shows for RAI television: Serate Da Campione, Chi Tiriamo In Ballo, Viva Le Donne, Serate Di Stelle, and The Eurovision Song Contest. An Italian fan posted videos from "Al Paradise" which set off a cult following of her dance. However, her career is as much as a singer/songwriter as a dancer.

Carlson signed her first recording contract with Cinevox Records (Italy) in which she co-wrote and recorded "Celebration" for the Eurovision Song Contest along with the song "One Night" and multiple demos.

Her second recording contract was with BMG (England) and the single "Mental," released with the group The Manic MC's, (RCA PB 43037) went to the top 30 on UK dance chart in 1989 and reached number 12 on Italian Dance Chart. She signed her third recording contract with Baby Records/Polygram (Europe) and released the album She.

After living in Europe for about seven years, she longed to return to New York City. Upon resettling there, she became a regular fixture in the downtown music scene, performing in clubs such as The Bitter End and CBGB, in addition to writing and recording the album Doorways. A video for the song "I Know Nothing" (from Doorways) was filmed in NYC and Woodstock, NY.

Her latest album, Heartdance was released in late 2012. It was a 14-song album for which she wrote all the songs, performed many of the parts, and co-produced with Scott Ansell. The music has a dance feel.

Aside from performance, Carlson is a Reiki master.

== Music and dance performances ==
- Fly to Paradise, a piece on AL PARADISE 1984 – Carlson sings and dances the intro of Italian Saturday night show "AL PARADISE", by Antonello Falqui and Michele Guardì. This piece included a large cast, Sara, chorus dancers and crabmen, Carlson performs classical and modern dance with movements that visually seem ironic as well as impossible.
- In 1991 she performed the opening ceremony to the Eurovision Song Contest, The music was written by Carlson in collaboration with Matteo Bonsanto, Marco Sabiu, M. Guarnerio. The intent was to mix old and new, given the location of the contest in Ancient Rome. The music video was performed at the ruins of Tivoli, it also featured Glen White. Seven million Italians tuned in to watch the show and Carlson had already become famous in Italy.
- Stephane Grappelli Jazz Violinist performed Sweet Georgia Brown RAI UNO as Sara Carlson danced jazz style with her own usual unique qualities. Directed by Antonello Falqui, Choreography by Don Lurio, costumes by Corrado Colabucci.
- She performed in Flashdance Maniac with Sara Carlson on "Al Paradise": directed by Antonello Falqui and choreographed by Michele Assaf. Its cult-like following refers to this dance as the "Wall Dance"
- Doug Graham and Carlson performed with her in a mock "Tango Contest" on Italian TV with Milva in 1983.
- Sara Carlson danced to a rare film of The Rolling Stones, featuring Doug Graham & Steve Harding was directed by Antonello Falqui and choreography by Don Lurio
- "America" Sara Carlson, Doug Graham and Stephen Harding's dance sung by Milva in Italian on "Al Paradise" in 1983
- The Army Now by Art of Noise, with Carlson dancing "Warrioress Dance" Directed by Antonello Falqui featuring Doug Graham & Mario. Directed by Antonello Falqui, choreography by Don Lurio and costumes by Corrado Colabucci. This was one of her most strenuous dance performances with edge breaking music.
- Cowgirl Dance included a western theme and a large cast on Al Paradise in 1984
- Secrets Of Love appeared on Rai-Due, Chi Tiriamo in Ballo, closing credits, 80s glam rock dance in front of Saturday Fever film clips, she did a disco dance performance with Douglas Graham and Steve Harding.
- She acted in the music video for The Power Station's version of "Get It On (Bang a Gong)" (originally by T. Rex), which featured Carlson dancing in silhouette; released on May 23, 1985; similar to Harry Shum Jr. in the famous iPod commercial.
- She appeared as one of the power female dancers in the Pat Benatar music video "Love Is A Battlefield," 1983
- Her most recent recorded dance is "Rising To Divinity" and will appear on her upcoming CD, HeartDance, Published by Think Love (ASCAP) An S & S Studios Production.

== Film appearances ==
- The in Crowd, as Key Dancer, in 1988
- The Bedroom Window as a Dancer, in 1987
- Portfolio, with Kelly Emberg, Julie Wolfe and Paulina Porizkova, as a Dancer, 1983

== Press ==
Her album, Doorways received a glowing review from Billboard Magazine. "An irresistible collection of tunes that wash over the mind like a cool breeze, her songs are like mini-movies, richly detailed and empathetic," reads the review, written by Larry Flick.

In 2012, she did an interview with The Aquarian regarding the release of her latest CD Heartdance.
