= Thick =

Thick may refer to:

- A bulky or heavyset body shape or overweight
- Thick (album), 1999 fusion jazz album by Tribal Tech
- Thick concept, in philosophy, a concept that is both descriptive and evaluative
- Thick description, in anthropology, a description that explains a behaviour along with its broader context
- Thick Records, a Chicago-based record label
- Thick set, in mathematics, set of integers containing arbitrarily long intervals
- Thick fluid, a viscous fluid

== See also ==
- Thicke, a surname
- Thickened fluids, a medically prescribed substance
- Thickening, a cooking process
- Thickening agent, a substance used in cooking
- Thickhead (disambiguation)
- Thickness (disambiguation)
