= La bellezza di Ippolita =

1962 film

- Film poster
- Directed by: Giancarlo Zagni
- Written by: Pasquale Festa Campanile; Massimo Franciosa; Giancarlo Zagni
- Story by: Elio Bartolini
- Produced by: Alfredo Bini
- Starring: Gina Lollobrigida
- Cinematography: Aldo Scavarda
- Edited by: Nino Baragli
- Music by: Carlo Rustichelli
- Release date: 9 February 1962
- Running time: 96 minutes
- Country: Italy
- Language: Italian

La bellezza di Ippolita is a 1962 Italian comedy film directed by Giancarlo Zagni, starring Gina Lollobrigida and Enrico Maria Salerno. It was entered into the 12th Berlin International Film Festival.

== Cast ==
- Gina Lollobrigida as Ippolita
- Enrico Maria Salerno as Luca
- Milva as Adriana
- Lars Bloch
- Angela Portaluri
- Bruno Scipioni
- Piero Palermini
- Franco Balducci
- Ariel Mannoni
- Renato Mambor
- Franco Giacobini
- Carlo Giuffrè
