= Aldo Scavarda =

Italian cinematographer (born 1923)

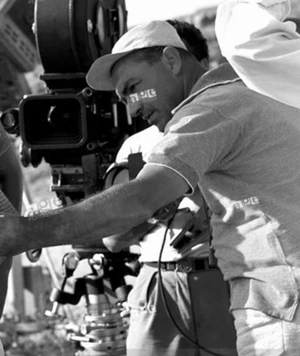
Aldo Scavarda

Aldo Scavarda (born 22 August 1923, date of death unknown) was an Italian cinematographer who collaborated with Michelangelo Antonioni (L'Avventura, 1960), Bernardo Bertolucci (Before the Revolution, 1964), Mauro Bolognini (From a Roman Balcony, 1960), Luigi Comencini (On the Tiger's Back, 1961), Salvatore Samperi, Sergio Sollima, and others.

== Life and career ==
Aldo Scavarda was born in Turin, Italy on 22 August 1923.

In 1969, for his cinematography on Salvatore Samperi's Come Play with Me, he won the Silver Ribbon prize.

In 1975, he directed his only film La linea del fiume, which won the Golden Gryphon prize at the Giffoni Film Festival, in 1976.

Scavarda is deceased.

== Filmography ==
- L'Avventura (1960)
- From a Roman Balcony (1960)
- The Two Rivals (1960)
- On the Tiger's Back (1961)
- La bellezza di Ippolita (1962)
- The Police Commissioner (1962)
- Before the Revolution (1964)
- Un amore (1965)
- Man from Canyon City (1965)
- Blockhead (1966)
- Killer 77, Alive or Dead (1966)
- Come Play with Me (1968)
- Execution (1968)
- Cuore di mamma (1969)
- A Season in Hell (1971)
- Un gioco per Eveline (1971)
- Devil in the Brain (1972)
- Revolver (1973)
