= The Ellen DeGeneres Show season 3 =

The Ellen DeGeneres Show
- Season 3
- Starring: Ellen DeGeneres
- No. of episodes: 170

Release
- Original release: September 5, 2005 – June 2, 2006

Season chronology
- ← Previous; Season 2 Next → Season 4

This is a list of episodes of the third season of The Ellen DeGeneres Show, which aired from September 2005 to June 2006.

== Episodes ==
No. overall	No. in season	Original release date	Guests
347	1	September 5, 2005	Jeff Gordon, Rihanna, ScrubsHarvey Levin
348	2	September 6, 2005	Ray Romano, Alicia Keys, Dr Phil
349	3	September 7, 2005	Debra Messing, Hilary Duff
350	4	September 8, 2005	Cast of The O.C., George Lopez
351	5	September 9, 2005	Kanye West, Jeff Foxworthy
352	6	September 12, 2005	David Spade, Matthew Sawchuk, Tommy Lee
353	7	September 13, 2005	Lauren Graham, Jeffrey Tambor
354	8	September 14, 2005	Melanie Griffith, Chris O'Donnell
355	9	September 15, 2005	Gwyneth Paltrow, Leah Remini, Marc Cherry
356	10	September 16, 2005	Charlie Sheen, Cynthia Nixon
357	11	September 19, 2005	Ellen's Live Emmy Special Rico Rodiguez
358	12	September 20, 2005	Donald Trump, Paul Reiser, Peter Falk, Pussycat Dolls
359	13	September 21, 2005	Johnny Knoxville, Maroon 5, Carla Gugino
360	14	September 22, 2005	James Denton, Rachel Weisz
361	15	September 23, 2005	Nicollette Sheridan, Chi McBride, Trisha Yearwood
362	16	September 26, 2005	Jodie Foster, Trisha Yearwood, Nick Cannon
363	17	September 27, 2005	Alec Baldwin, Alyson Hannigan
364	18	September 28, 2005	Jennifer Garner, Josh Kelley, Michael Rapaport
365	19	September 29, 2005	Jerry O'Connell, Fran Drescher Two and a half men
366	20	September 30, 2005	Jennifer Love Hewitt, Jared Padalecki
367	21	October 3, 2005	Josh Duhamel, Joely Fisher
368	22	October 4, 2005	Jessica Alba, Noah Wyle, Toni Braxton
369	23	October 5, 2005	Liz Phair, Constance Marie
370	24	October 6, 2005	Cameron Diaz, Paul Walker, Jo Dee Messina
371	25	October 7, 2005	Don Johnson, Vanessa Marcil, Christina Aguilera
372	26	October 10, 2005	Matthew McConaughey, Wynonna Judd
373	27	October 11, 2005	Denise Richards, Sherri Shepherd
374	28	October 12, 2005	Rene Russo, Naveen Andrews
375	29	October 13, 2005	Kevin Bacon, Sara Rue
376	30	October 14, 2005	Kirsten Dunst, Babyface, Mickey Rourke
377	31	October 17, 2005	Amy Brenneman, Jeff Corwin, Jimmy Kimmel
378	32	October 18, 2005	Meryl Streep, Jason Lee
379	33	October 19, 2005	Charlize Theron, Jeff Daniels
380	34	October 20, 2005	Rod Stewart, Dakota Fanning
381	35	October 21, 2005	Sharon Stone, Tyler James Williams
382	36	October 24, 2005	Barbra Streisand, Ashlee Simpson Judge Judy
383	37	October 25, 2005	Susan Sarandon, Stevie Wonder
384	38	October 26, 2005	Benjamin Bratt, Elisabeth Shue, All-American Rejects
385	39	October 27, 2005	Antonio Banderas, Kathryn Morris
386	40	October 28, 2005	Catherine Zeta-Jones, Sherri Shepherd, David Gray
387	41	October 31, 2005	Jane Kaczmarek, Emily Procter
388	42	November 1, 2005	Julie Bowen, Zach Braff Modern Family Blue's Clues
389	43	November 2, 2005	Steve Zahn, Jimmy Smits, Lisa Marie Presley
390	44	November 3, 2005	Tour of Warner Bros. Studio
391	45	November 4, 2005	Ricky Martin, Sherri Shepherd
392	46	November 7, 2005	Neil Patrick Harris and Pamela Anderson
393	47	November 8, 2005	John Cusack and Jaime Pressly
394	48	November 9, 2005	Chad Michael Murray and Martha Stewart
395	49	November 10, 2005	Jake Gyllenhaal, Carmen Electra
396	50	November 11, 2005	Jennifer Aniston, Kenny Chesney, Hugh Laurie
397	51	November 14, 2005	Paul McCartney
398	52	November 15, 2005	Geena Davis, Ryan Reynolds
399	53	November 16, 2005	Reese Witherspoon, Terrence Howard, Hazel Smith
400	54	November 17, 2005	Robert Downey Jr., Maura Tierney
401	55	November 18, 2005	Mariah Carey, Evangeline Lilly, Marc Yu
402	56	November 21, 2005	Usher, Cyndi Lauper, Rosie Perez, the cast of “Rent”
403	57	November 22, 2005	Kim Cattrall, Bon Jovi, the Radio City Music Hall Rockettes
404	58	November 23, 2005	Matt Lauer, Tina Fey, Rachel Dratch, Amy Poehler
405	59	November 24, 2005	Gwyneth Paltrow, Leah Remini, Marc Cherry
406	60	November 25, 2005	Queen Latifah, Billy Joel
407	61	November 28, 2005	Patricia Heaton, Neil Diamond, Michael Sessions
408	62	November 29, 2005	Dennis Quaid
409	63	November 30, 2005	Jay Leno
410	64	December 1, 2005	Anthony LaPaglia, Ty Pennington
411	65	December 2, 2005	Harry Connick Jr., Wolfgang Puck
412	66	December 5, 2005	Courteney Cox, Daryl Hannah, Martina McBride
413	67	December 6, 2005	Ted Danson, Shakira, Aisha Tyler
414	68	December 7, 2005	Marg Helgenberger, Mekhi Phifer
415	69	December 8, 2005	Amanda Peet, Treat Williams, Vera Wang
416	70	December 9, 2005	Martin Sheen, Molly Sims
417	71	December 12, 2005	Diane Keaton, Colin Hanks
418	72	December 13, 2005	Jim Carrey, Bo Bice
419	73	December 14, 2005	Lindsay Lohan, Alicia Keys
420	74	December 15, 2005	Sarah Jessica Parker, Anthony Hamilton
421	75	December 16, 2005	Cast members of the remake of The Producers, including Nathan Lane, Matthew Broderick, Will Ferrell and Uma Thurman
422	76	January 2, 2006	Téa Leoni, Enrique Murciano, Ginuwine
423	77	January 3, 2006	Tom Selleck, Kristin Chenoweth, 6 year old Quinn Sullivan
424	78	January 4, 2006	Melina Kanakaredes, Anthony Anderson, Chris Brown Blackish
425	79	January 5, 2006	Steve Carell, Betty White, John Mayer Trio
426	80	January 6, 2006	Kanye West, Doug Savant
427	81	January 9, 2006	Patricia Arquette, Mekhi Phifer
428	82	January 10, 2006	Michael Chiklis, Rick Springfield
429	83	January 11, 2006	Dominic Monaghan, Matt Dillon
430	84	January 12, 2006	Billy Crystal
431	85	January 13, 2006	Greg Kinnear, Jean Smart
432	86	January 16, 2006	Kanye West, Anne Hathaway
433	87	January 17, 2006	Paula Abdul
434	88	January 18, 2006	Matthew Fox
435	89	January 19, 2006	Pierce Brosnan, Q'Orianka Kilcher, Heidi Klum
436	90	January 20, 2006	Constance Marie, Geoffrey Gallante
437	91	January 23, 2006	Colin Firth, Jenna Elfman
438	92	January 24, 2006	Alicia Silverstone, Shemar Moore
439	93	January 25, 2006	Martin Lawrence, Fred Savage, Sarah McLachlan
440	94	January 26, 2006	Mary J. Blige, Sherri Shepherd
441	95	January 27, 2006	Emma Thompson, Blair Underwood, Heather Headley
442	96	January 30, 2006	Jon Cryer, Jennifer Esposito
443	97	January 31, 2006	Jane Kaczmarek, Christopher Meloni
444	98	February 1, 2006	Jason Mraz, Sean Hayes
445	99	February 2, 2006	Teri Hatcher, Paul Bettany
446	100	February 3, 2006	Leah Remini, Neil Patrick Harris
447	101	February 6, 2006	Barry Manilow, 30th High School Reunion
448	102	February 8, 2006	Queen Latifah, Bonnie Raitt
449	103	February 9, 2006	Nelly, Madonna
450	104	February 10, 2006	Harrison Ford, Faith Hill, Travis Stork
451	105	February 13, 2006	Heath Ledger, Sheryl Crow, Sherri Shepherd
452	106	February 14, 2006	Lauren Graham, Jeff Probst
453	107	February 15, 2006	Jason Biggs, Minnie Driver, Drew Lachey
454	108	February 16, 2006	Tyra Banks, Betty White
455	109	February 17, 2006	Keira Knightley, Paul Reiser
456	110	February 20, 2006	Alyson Hannigan, Penny Marshall, Rihanna and the Nike Dancers.
457	111	February 21, 2006	Simon Cowell, James Blunt
458	112	February 22, 2006	Samuel L. Jackson, Famke Janssen, Natasha Bedingfield
459	113	February 23, 2006	Dolly Parton, Stacy Keibler, John Krasinski
460	114	February 24, 2006	Marcia Cross, Rosie Perez
461	115	February 27, 2006	Steve Harvey, Hilary Duff
462	116	February 28, 2006	Dennis Quaid, Cowboy Mouth
463	117	March 1, 2006	Eddie Cibrian, Felicity Huffman
464	118	March 2, 2006	Carl Reiner, Rosanne Cash, Jennifer Love Hewitt, Sasha Cohen
465	119	March 3, 2006	Apolo Anton Ohno, as Vegas” cast members James Caan, Josh Duhamel, Molly Sims, James Lesure and Nikki Cox
466	120	March 6, 2006	James Spader, Jennifer Finnigan
467	121	March 7, 2006	Martin Short, Emilie De Ravin, Three 6 Mafia
468	122	March 8, 2006	Robert Downey Jr., KT Tunstall, Amanda Bynes
469	123	March 9, 2006	Tim Allen, Floetry
470	124	March 10, 2006	Donald Trump, Train, Michelle Rodriguez
471	125	March 20, 2006	John Edward, Julia Louis-Dreyfus
472	126	March 21, 2006	Freddie Prinze Jr., Chris Noth, Jammx Kids
473	127	March 22, 2006	Vin Diesel, Howie Mandel
474	128	March 23, 2006	George Lopez, Morgan Freeman, Natasha Bedingfield
475	129	March 24, 2006	Liza Minnelli, Orlando Jones
476	130	April 3, 2006	Brendan Fraser, Shakira, Sherri Shepherd
477	131	April 4, 2006	John Goodman, Tim McGraw, Kevin Covais
478	132	April 5, 2006	Kelsey Grammer, LL Cool J
479	133	April 6, 2006	Sharon Stone, DMC, Whoopi Goldberg
480	134	April 7, 2006	Jennifer Aniston, Scott Foley
481	135	April 10, 2006	Anjelica Huston, Justin Chambers
482	136	April 11, 2006	Rebecca Romijn, Stephen Collins, Les Stroud
483	137	April 12, 2006	David Spade, Catherine Keener, NE-YO
484	138	April 13, 2006	Ray Romano, Jeff Corwin, Kelly Monaco
485	139	April 14, 2006	Charlie Sheen, Pink
486	140	April 17, 2006	Jamie Foxx, Jeff Bridges, Bucky Covington
487	141	April 18, 2006	Randy Jackson, Rhea Perlman, Toby Keith
488	142	April 19, 2006	Wanda Sykes, Poppy Montgomery
489	143	April 20, 2006	Kiefer Sutherland, Maya Rudolph, Tanya Streeter
490	144	April 21, 2006	Rob Lowe, Kate Walsh, Teddy Geiger
491	145	April 24, 2006	Elton John, Kim Raver, Ace Young
492	146	April 25, 2006	Sally Field, Kenny Rogers, Jodelle Ferland
493	147	April 26, 2006	Roseanne, David Boreanaz
494	148	April 27, 2006	Robin Williams, Daniel Powter, Wentworth Miller
495	149	April 28, 2006	Michael Douglas, Jenna Fischer
496	150	May 1, 2006	Paris Hilton, Kellie Pickler, David Frei
497	151	May 2, 2006	Geena Davis, Nigel Lythgoe
498	152	May 3, 2006	Ryan Seacrest, Merv Griffin
499	153	May 4, 2006	Candice Bergen, Mekhi Phifer
500	154	May 5, 2006	Ellen Pompeo, Craig Ferguson
501	155	May 8, 2006	Luke Wilson, Shemar Moore, Paris Bennett
502	156	May 9, 2006	Samuel L. Jackson, Famke Janssen, Natasha Bedingfield
503	157	May 10, 2006	Lindsay Lohan, Chris Isaak, Ty Pennington
504	158	May 11, 2006	Cast of The West Wing
505	159	May 12, 2006	Mothers Day Show Tom Cruise, Jane Kaczmarek
506	160	May 15, 2006	Ellen In The Park Show Kanye West, Howie Mandel
507	161	May 16, 2006	Nick Lachey, Ron Howard, Chris Daughtry
508	162	May 17, 2006	Ellen Comes Home Show Julie Andrews
509	163	May 18, 2006	500th Show Diane Keaton, Paul Simon, Sherri Shepherd
510	164	May 19, 2006	Teri Hatcher, Harold Perrineau
511	165	May 22, 2006	Farewell To Tony Show Evangeline Lilly, Jamie Kennedy
512	166	May 23, 2006	Nicollette Sheridan, Michael Bolton, Omar Epps
513	167	May 24, 2006	Jack Black, Kristin Chenoweth
514	168	May 25, 2006	Randy Jackson, Paul Simon, Bill Clinton
515	169	May 26, 2006	Hugh Jackman, Flavor Flav
516	170	June 2, 2006	Season Finale Vince Vaughn, Taylor Hicks
