= From a Roman Balcony =

1960 Italian–French film

- Directed by: Mauro Bolognini
- Written by: Pier Paolo Pasolini; Alberto Moravia; Marco Visconti
- Produced by: Paul Graetz
- Starring: Jean Sorel; Lea Massari; Jeanne Valérie
- Cinematography: Aldo Scavarda
- Edited by: Nino Baragli
- Music by: Piero Piccioni
- Production companies: Euro International Films; Produzioni Intercontinentali; Transcontinental Films
- Distributed by: Euro International Films (Italy); Variety Distribution (Export)
- Release dates: 1960 (Italy); 4 January 1961 (France)
- Running time: 102/89/79 minutes
- Countries: Italy; France
- Language: Italian

From a Roman Balcony (Italian: La giornata balorda, French: Ça s'est passé à Rome) is a 1960 Italian–French drama film directed by Mauro Bolognini. It is based on several stories by Alberto Moravia, who also co-wrote the screenplay with Pier Paolo Pasolini and Marco Visconti. The Italian theatrical release suffered several censorship problems, including the blocking of screenings, and a criminal complaint against director Bolognini and screenwriters Moravia and Pasolini.

The film was also shown under the alternate English titles Pickup in Rome, A Crazy Day and Love is a Day's Work.

== Plot ==
Davide, a twenty-year-old living in the Roman suburbs, and his girlfriend Ivana have just become parents of a young son. Blamed by both his and Ivana's mother for his idle and irresponsible ways, Davide starts out to look for a day job. On his way, he meets his former girlfriend Marina, who in her own words now works as a "manicure", but is actually a prostitute. After a short sexual encounter, Marina helps him blackmail her client Moglie into giving Davide a job, which consists simply in accompanying driver Carpiti who carries out various tasks for shady industrialist Romani. On their way, the two men cheat prostitute Sabina out of her money, before meeting with their customer. Freya, Romani's mistress, takes an interest in Davide and, after sending Carpiti away under a pretense, sleeps with Davide at the beach. Afterwards, she gives him 50,000 lire which will help Davide acquire a steady job at a general market. Davide loses almost all of the money due to his inattentiveness, but manages to steal a precious ring from a corpse in an open casket. In the evening, he returns home to Ivana and her mother, bragging about his money and toying around with his young son.

== Cast ==
- Jean Sorel as Davide
- Lea Massari as Freya
- Jeanne Valérie as Marina
- Rik Battaglia as Carpiti
- Valeria Ciangottini as Ivana
- Isabelle Corey as Sabina
- Paolo Stoppa as Moglie, book-keeper

== Censorship ==
From a Roman Balcony, originally 102 minutes long, underwent several cuts. In September 1960, a version running 89 minutes was presented to the Ministero del turismo e dello spettacolo, Italy's film censorship board, which rated it as VM16 (not suitable for children under 16). In addition, the committee imposed the following scenes to be deleted, trimming the film to 83 minutes: 1) the scene in which Davide and Marina hug each other in the room where the dead body lies (reel 4); 2) the scene on the terrace, in which Marina offers herself to David taking off her shirt (reel 5); 3) the scene in the woods, in which David and Freja lie on the ground and he starts undressing; 4) The scene where they remain lying next to each other after sexual intercourse must be shortened; 5) in the song the following sentence must be deleted: "... if your mother is a prostitute you are the daughter of a bitch... (page 8)"; 6) the following sentences must be deleted: Freja: "... you like women of your same age or prostitutes?", Davide: "... well, after I paid the prostitutes, how am I going to find the other women... usually prostitutes (page 74)." Further cuts were imposed in May 1961, resulting in a running time of 79 minutes. For the film's 1977 TV screening, the film was reviewed again and approved in a 79 minutes long version.

== Reception ==
In his review for La Stampa, critic Leo Pestelli emphasised Bolognini's "attentive" direction, Moravia's and Pasolini's "cinematic" writing and (with the exception of Lea Massari) the "fiery" cast. The Segnalazioni cinematografiche, although approving of the acting and cinematography, found the film "fragmented and discontinuous" and the direction "solely aimed at achieving certain effects".

== Legacy ==
From a Roman Balcony was repeatedly screened at the Cinémathèque française between 2010 and 2019 in a 89 minutes running French version.

The film was released on an Italian Region 2 DVD by A & R Productions in 2014 and re-released by Mustang Entertainment/RTI/Univideo in 2020.
