= Al Paradise =

- Country of origin: Italy
- Original language: Italian
- No. of seasons: 3
- No. of episodes: 40

Original release
- Network: Rai 1
- Release: February 11, 1983 – June 29, 1985

Al paradise is an Italian variety show that aired from 1983 to 1985 that was an entry point for many European as well as American stars. Celebrities Milva, Oreste Lionello and Vivian Reed were considered stars of the show.

== Appearances ==
From 1983 to 1985, Lory Bianco (Bonnie Bianco) was featured and sang and danced in the famous prime time Saturday Italian variety show Al Paradise. She became an overnight success in Italy. Her film Cinderella 80 was also released at the same time in the movie theaters and this as well gave her instant success as an actress in Italy.

Arturo Brachetti participated as the guest star in 10 episodes of Al Paradise (1985). He went on to appear on The Drew Carey Show, and in December 2011, he received the title of Chevalier des Arts et des Lettres from the French Ministry of Culture Frédéric Mitterrand.

Mariangela Melato after leaving Italy to achieve success in America, one of her most famous parts with a supporting role as villainess General Kala in Flash Gordon (1980), she was not able to sustain success in the United States. She went back to her roots and was a regular on Al Paradise, in comedy roles.

Sara Carlson is an American singer, songwriter and dancer. She has released three full-length music albums, and her songs have appeared in American film and television. While starring on the #1 rated TV show Al Paradise on RaiUno (Italy), along with five other prime-time shows, she influenced a generation of post-disco dance, performing some of the most memorable dances of the era. She has appeared in over 25 American and international commercials ranging from Dr. Pepper to Bacardi; three major motion pictures; iconic rock videos, including The Power Station's cover of the T. Rex classic "Get It In (Bang a Gong)" and Pat Benatar's "Love Is a Battlefield"; and even had a recurring role as TJ on Guiding Light on CBS (USA). Her latest album, Heartdance out now. A recent internet cult following of Carlson has renewed interest in Al Paradise.

The third season included a musical spoof of The Bethrothed, care of the Quartetto Cetra, with Al Bano and Romina Power as Renzo and Lucia. The parody had been planned twenty years before for Biblioteca di Studio Uno.

== Hosts ==
The variety showed had many hosts who appeared in a variety of roles, such as Oreste Lionello

- Milva (Ilva Maria Biolcati) 1983
- Oreste Lionello
- Vivian Reed
- Heather Parisi
- Director: Antonello Falqui
- Production Co: Radiotelevisione Italiana RAI
