= Milva =

Italian singer and actress (1939–2021)

Milva OMRI
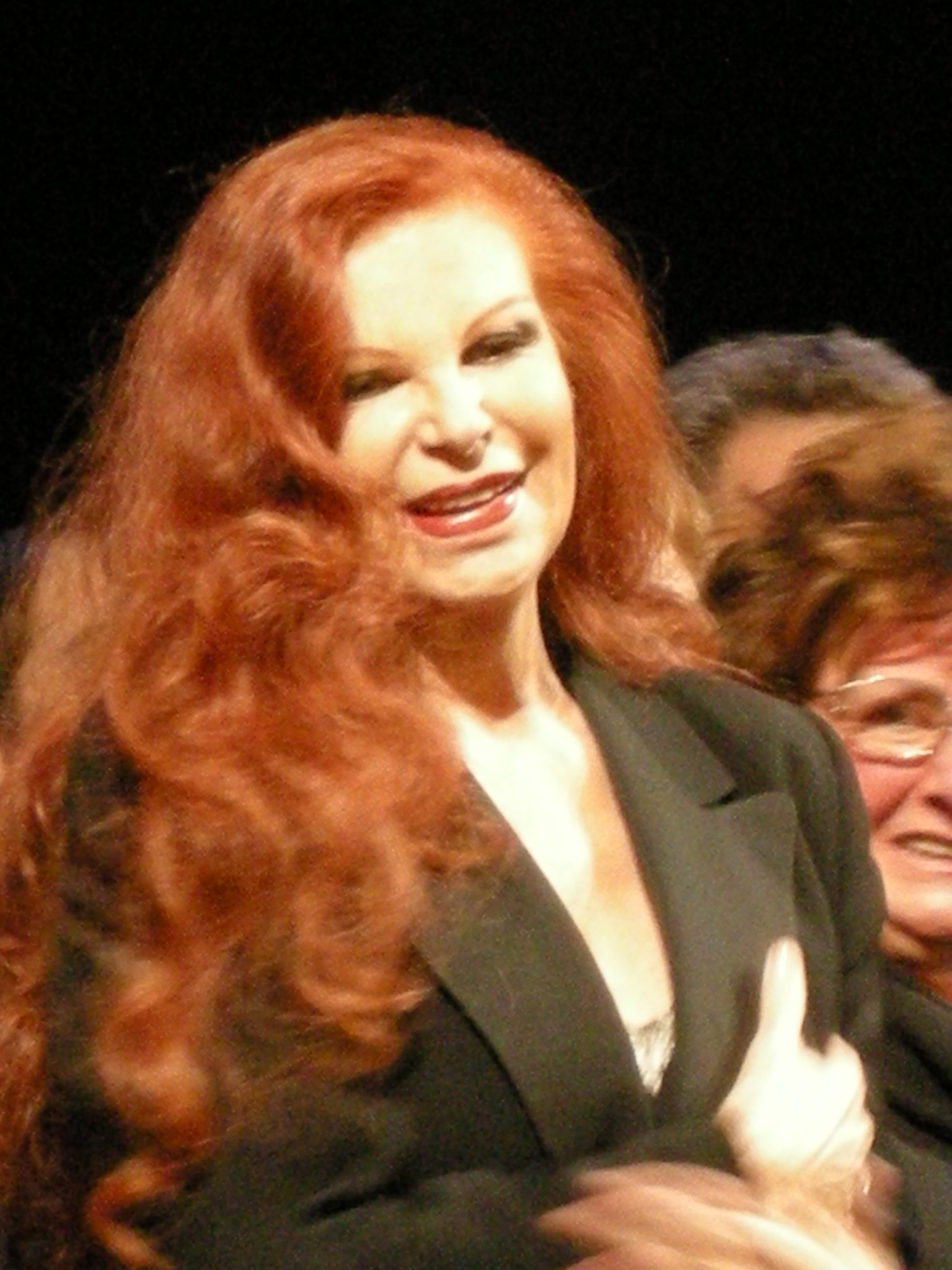
- Milva at a theatre presentation of La variante di Lüneburg (2009)

Background information
- Also known as: Milva La Rossa; La Pantera di Goro
- Born: Maria Ilva Biolcati; 17 July 1939; Goro, Emilia–Romagna, Kingdom of Italy
- Died: 23 April 2021 (aged 81) Milan, Lombardy, Italy
- Genres: Pop; schlager; chanson; classical; tango; nuevo tango; canzone napoletana; folk; musica leggera
- Occupations: Singer; actress
- Years active: 1958–2012
- Labels: Fonit Cetra; Ricordi; Metronome; BMG Ricordi; BMG Ariola; BMG
- Website: www.MilvaLaRossa.com

Maria Ilva Biolcati (Italian: [maˈriːa ˈilva bjolˈkaːti]; 17 July 1939 – 23 April 2021), known as Milva (Italian: [ˈmilva]), was an Italian singer, stage and film actress, and television personality. She was also known as La Rossa (Italian for "The Redhead"), due to the characteristic colour of her hair, and additionally as La Pantera di Goro ("The Panther of Goro"), which stemmed from the Italian press having nicknamed the three most popular Italian female singers of the 1960s, combining the names of animals and the singers' birthplaces. The colour also characterised her leftist political beliefs, claimed in numerous statements. Popular in Italy and abroad, she performed on musical and theatrical stages the world over, and received popular acclaim in her native Italy, and particularly in Germany and Japan, where she often participated in musical events and televised musical programmes. She released numerous albums in France, Japan, Korea, Greece, Spain, and South America.

She collaborated with European composers and musicians including Ennio Morricone in 1965, Francis Lai in 1973, Mikis Theodorakis in 1978 (Was ich denke became a best selling album in Germany), Enzo Jannacci in 1980, Vangelis in 1981 and 1986, and Franco Battiato in 1982, 1986 and 2010.

Her stage productions of Bertolt Brecht's recitals and Luciano Berio's operas toured the world's theatres. She performed at La Scala in Milan, at the Deutsche Oper in Berlin, at the Paris Opera, in the Royal Albert Hall in London and at the Edinburgh Festival, amongst others.

Having had success both in Italy and internationally, she remained one of the most popular Italian personalities in the fields of music and theatre. Her artistic stature was officially recognised by the Italian, German and French Republics, each of which bestowed her with the highest honours. She was the only Italian artist in contemporary times who was simultaneously: Chevalier of the National Order of the Legion of Honour of the French Republic (Paris, 11 September 2009), Commander of the Order of Merit of the Italian Republic (Rome, 2 June 2007), Officer of the Order of Merit of the Federal Republic of Germany (Berlin, 2006), and Officier of the Ordre des Arts et des Lettres (Paris, 1995).

== Life and career ==
=== Early life and career beginnings ===
Maria Ilva Biolcati was born in Goro, Province of Ferrara, Italy, on 17 July 1939. In 1959, when she was twenty, she won a contest for new voices, and was named the overall winner from more than seven thousand six hundred participants. In 1960 she recorded her first 7" single with Cetra Records: Édith Piaf's song "Milord", included on her first LP release, 14 Successi di Milva (Cetra, 1961). Her live debut was on the stage of the Sanremo Music Festival in 1961, where she took third place.

=== 1960s ===
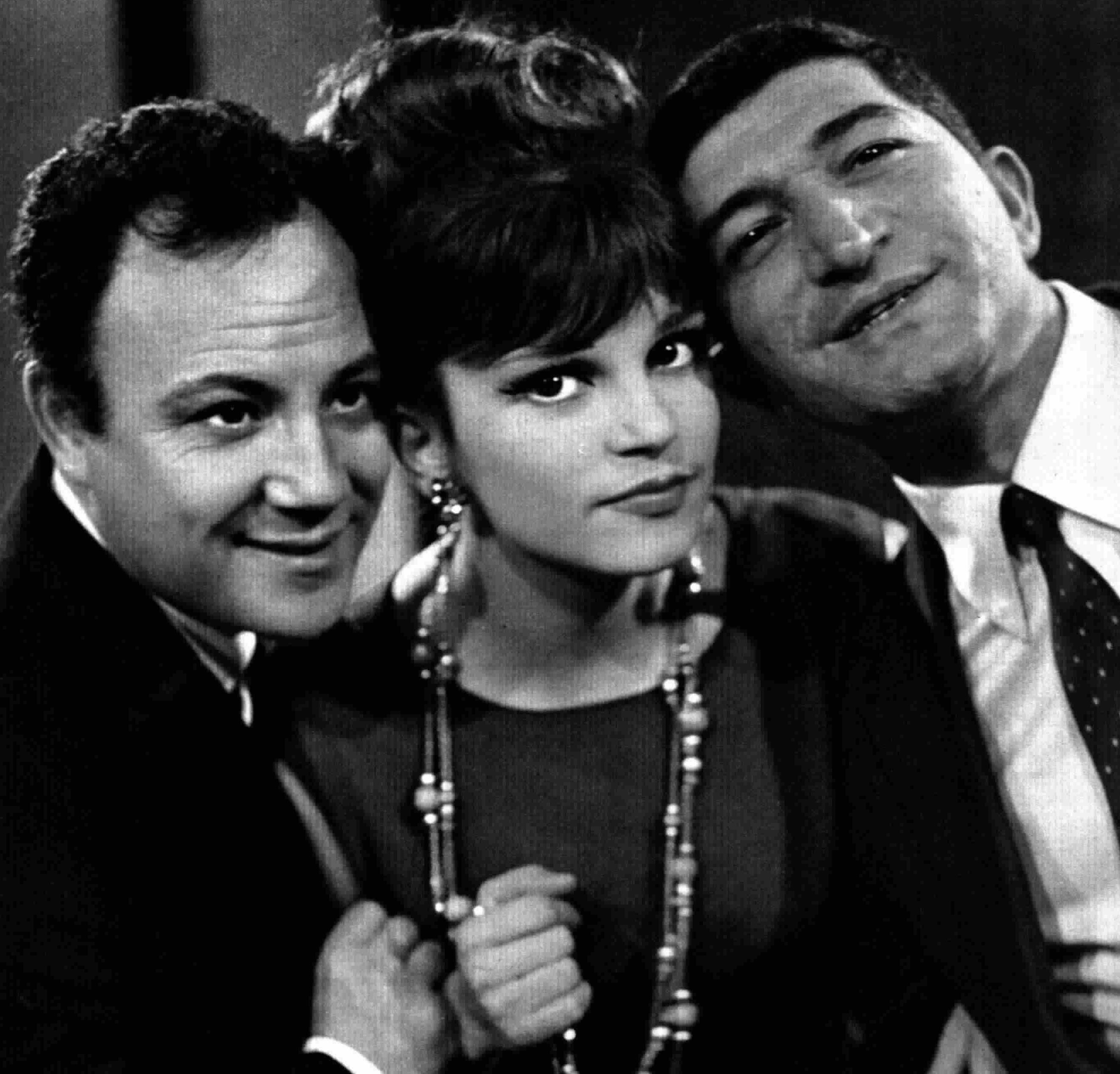
Claudio Villa, Milva and Nicola Arigliano in 1964

In 1962 Milva was the first singer to sing Édith Piaf's repertoire at the prestigious Olympia theatre in Paris. In 1983 she performed the repertoire at the venue again, receiving an ovation from the audience and the French press, very surprised how a non-French artist could interpret the songs of Piaf with such feeling and energy. Music critics named her singer of the year.

Shortly afterwards, Milva released her second LP record, Milva canta per voi, a studio album that compiled several songs previously published as singles, in addition to covers of Édith Piaf songs, such as Non, je ne regrette rien, translated to Italian as Nulla rimpiangerò, and Et maintenant, written by composer Gilbert Bécaud and lyricist Pierre Delanoë (a song which, in English, would later become known as What Now, My Love?").

In 1962, Milva co-starred in the Italian film La bellezza di Ippolita alongside Gina Lollobrigida and Enrico Maria Salerno, a comedy film directed by Giancarlo Zagni, playing the role of Adriana. The film was entered into the 12th Berlin International Film Festival. In the same year, she also appeared in the film Canzoni a tempo di twist, an Italian film directed by Stefano Canzio.

In February, Milva participated in the Sanremo Musical Festival of 1962, competing with Tango italiano, a jazz-infused song written by Bruno Pallesi and Walter Malgoni. Her performance earned her second place in the competition and the single that followed reached number one on the Italian charts.

From 30 April to 4 May 1963, Milva was a television presenter on the Italian variety show Il Cantatutto.

Shortly after, Milva released her third LP record Da Il Cantatutto con Milva e Villa, in which she performed studio versions of the songs she had sung on Il Cantatutto. In the album, she performed Quattro Vestiti, composed by Ennio Morricone, a song which would be released on an EP by the same name. Milva also recorded an EP for the Spanish market: Milva canta en español.

Later in the year, she released her fourth studio album Le Canzoni del Tabarin – Canzoni da Cortile, an Italian-language album that covered Italian songs from the 1920s and 1930s, featuring new musical arrangements, released on the Fonit Cetra label.

In January 1965, Milva released the multilingual studio album Canti della libertà, an album in which she sang revolutionary songs and songs of freedom, including the national anthem of France, La Marseilleise, written by Claude Joseph Rouget de Lisle, and La Carmagnole, a French song created and made popular during the French Revolution. Amongst the other songs that composed the album were Italian-language versions of the marching song John Brown's Song, the Spanish Los cuatro generales, and Fischia il vento, an Italian popular song based on the music of the Russian popular song Katyusha.

In 1965, a meeting led to a definitive change in her career: Italian director Giorgio Strehler helped to develop her skills in staging and singing in Italian theatres (especially the Piccolo Teatro in Milan) and she began to perform a more committed repertoire, including songs of the Italian resistance movement, songs from Bertolt Brecht's pieces). In the following years she starred in Giorgio Strehler's production of Brecht's The Threepenny Opera which was performed in several cities of Western Europe. Milva's albums were certificated gold and platinum in West Germany.

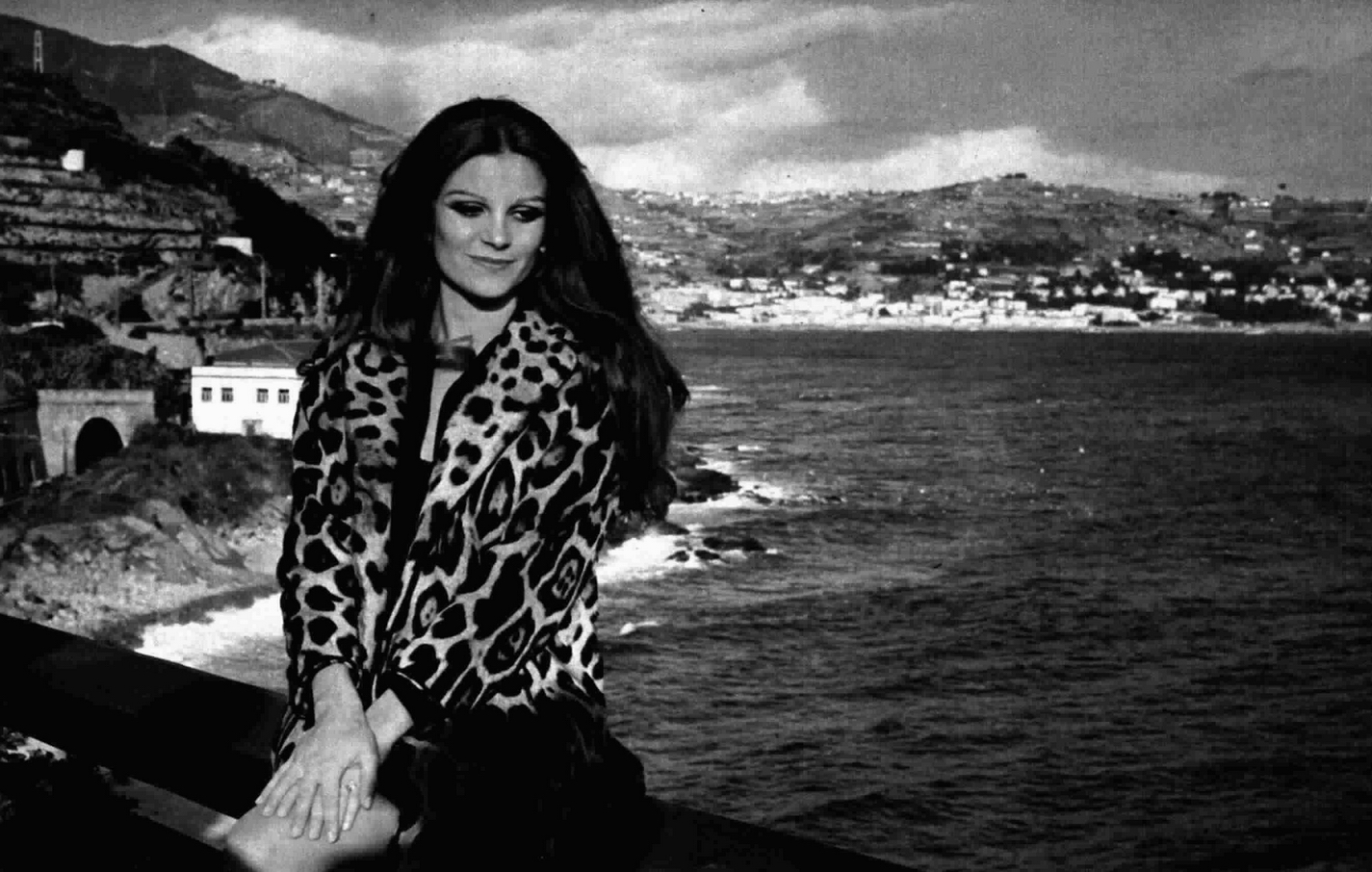
Milva in 1970

In 1968, Milva released her fifth studio album, Tango, an album that consisted of tango standards sung in Italian. The album was released in Italy, Germany, Spain and Brazil and featured an orchestra conducted by Iller Pattacini. In 1969, she released her sixth studio album Tango Inspirationen, an album released in Germany and composed of tango standards performed in German and Italian. Amongst the songs performed on the album were La Cumparsita, A Media Luz (Guardando intorno a te) and Adios, Pampa Mía. In 1975, the album was reissued as Milva singt Tangos deutsch und italienisch.

In late 1969, Milva co-starred in the Italian musical comedy Angeli in bandiera, alongside Gino Bramieri. The musical was written by Italian playwrights Pietro Garinei and Sandro Giovannini and featured music by Bruno Canfora and premiered on 20 October, at the Teatro Sistina, in Rome, Italy. An original cast recording of the musical featuring I cantori moderni di Alessandroni was released in Italy and Canada in the same year.

During the same year, Milva appeared in the Italian film Appuntamento in Riviera, a musical comedy directed by Mario Mattoli.

=== 1970s ===
1970 saw the release of the studio album Ritratto di Milva, an Italian-language featuring orchestrations composed and conducted by Detto Mariano, infused with pop and chanson elements. In September 1970, Milva performed concerts at Sankei Hall, in Tokyo, Japan, accompanied by Nobuo Hara and his big band, the Sharps & Flats. Excerpts of the recordings of the concerts were compiled and published on the live album Milva on Stage (Live at Tokyo Sankei Hall), released shortly thereafter on the Ricordi label.

In 1971, Milva released Milva canta Brecht, an album of music written by Bertolt Brecht and music composed by Hanns Eisler and Kurt Weill, directed by Giorgio Strehler.

In 1972, Milva appeared in the Italian film D'amore si muore, directed by Carlo Carunchio, starring in the role of Leyla. She also covered the title song of the movie, titled "D'amore si muore", a song composed and conducted by Italian composer, conductor and orchestrator Ennio Morricone with lyrics written by Carlo Carunchio and Giuseppe Patroni Griffi, which was included in her album Dedicato a Milva da Ennio Morricone, released in the same year. Following Milva's appearance in D'amore si muore, Ennio Morricone dedicated a series of songs from his film scores to Milva for her to sing lyrics to. The collaboration between the two musicians produced the studio album Dedicato a Milva da Ennio Morricone (Dedicated to Milva by Ennio Morricone), an album that featured music entirely written, composed, orchestrated and conducted by Morricone in which Milva covered twelve of his works, such as "Chi mai", "La Califfa", and the bossa nova infused "Metti, una sera a cena".

During the same year, Milva released a Japanese-language album, Love Feeling in Japan, containing twelve songs sung entirely in Japanese, released on the Ricordi label. She then released the live album Milva in Seoul in South Korea, accompanied by the Korean Broadcasting System Symphony Orchestra. It includes her singing "Barley Road" in Korean.

1972 additionally saw the release of her compilation album La filanda e altre storie.

In 1973, Milva collaborated with French composer Francis Lai, the output of their work resulting in the studio album Milva & Francis Lai – Sognavo Amore Mio, which was directed and orchestrated by Lai. Amongst the ten Lai compositions covered by Milva in the album were A Man and a Woman (Un homme et une femme) and Love Story. Milva also duetted with Lai on the song Oltre le colline.

In 1974, she released the studio album Sono matta da legare. The song Monica delle bambole was its lead single, released in 7" format in Italy and Yugoslavia.

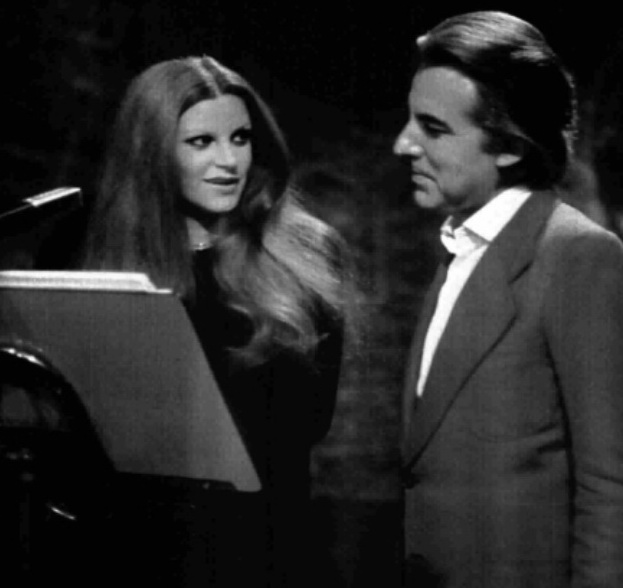
Milva and Italian composer Giorgio Gaslini in 1975

In 1975, Milva released Libertà, a studio album composed of military hymns, marches and folk songs whose central themes revolve around freedom and liberty. Among the songs featured on the album was Bertolt Brecht's Kälbermarsch, a parody of the song Horst Wessel Lied. The album was released on the Ricordi label in Italy, Germany and Japan.

In 1977, Milva released the eponymously titled studio album Milva, in which she performed Andrew Lloyd Webber's "Don't Cry for Me Argentina" from the musical Evita, in Italian, titled Non pianger più Argentina, which was the album's lead single. Milva was released in Italy, Spain, Belgium, Austria and Japan. In Germany, the album was released as Non pianger più Argentina.

In 1977, Milva released the studio album Auf den Flügeln bunter Träume, an album composed of popular German film and cabaret standards, including a version of "Lili Marleen" and "Tango notturno". The album was released in America, Canada and Germany and in 1998 was reissued in Japan.

In 1978, she released the live album Canzoni tra le due guerre, an album flavoured with chanson and jazz elements that was recorded live at the Piccolo Teatro di Milano in October 1977, in a musical show produced by Filippo Crivelli. The album was released in Germany as Lieder Zwischen den Kriegen.

In 1978, Milva began collaborating with Greek composer Mikis Theodorakis, resulting in the release of the studio album Von Tag zu Tag in Germany and Austria, which became a best-selling album in Germany. In 1979, the album La Mia Età, the Italian-language counterpart of Von Tag zu Tag was released. The album was released in Italy, Germany, Austria, Brazil, Japan, Greece, Spain, and Venezuela.

In 1979, Milva released the studio album Wenn wir uns Wiederseh'n, a German-language album that consisted of songs written by Austrian songwriter, composer and conductor Robert Stolz. The album was also released under the alternate title Schön war's heute Abend (Milva singt Robert Stolz).

From 1973 to 1980, Milva was on tour (Italy, USA, Greece, France, Germany, Canada, Russia and Japan) with the band "I Milvi" with Neno Vinciguerra on piano, Franco Paganelli on guitar, Claudio Barontini on bass, Giovanni Martelli on drums and Marco Gasperetti on flute.

=== 1980s ===
In 1980, Milva released the studio album, Attends, la vie, a French language album featuring songs composed by Greek composer Mikis Theodorakis, whose orchestrations were arranged by Italian composer Natale Massara. The album was released on the RCA Victor label in France, and on Metronome label in Germany. Milva had already worked with Mikis Theodorakis two years earlier, when she recorded Von Tag zu Tag and La Mia Età.

1980 also saw the release of La Rossa, a studio album featuring songs written and composed by Italian composer Enzo Jannacci. The album was released in Italy, Germany and Argentina. The title song, La Rossa, was released on the single La rossa/Quando il sipario and would come to be considered Milva's signature song. In the course of the same year, Milva released the multilingual compilation album Milva International which she sang in English, French, Spanish, Italian and German. It was released in Germany.

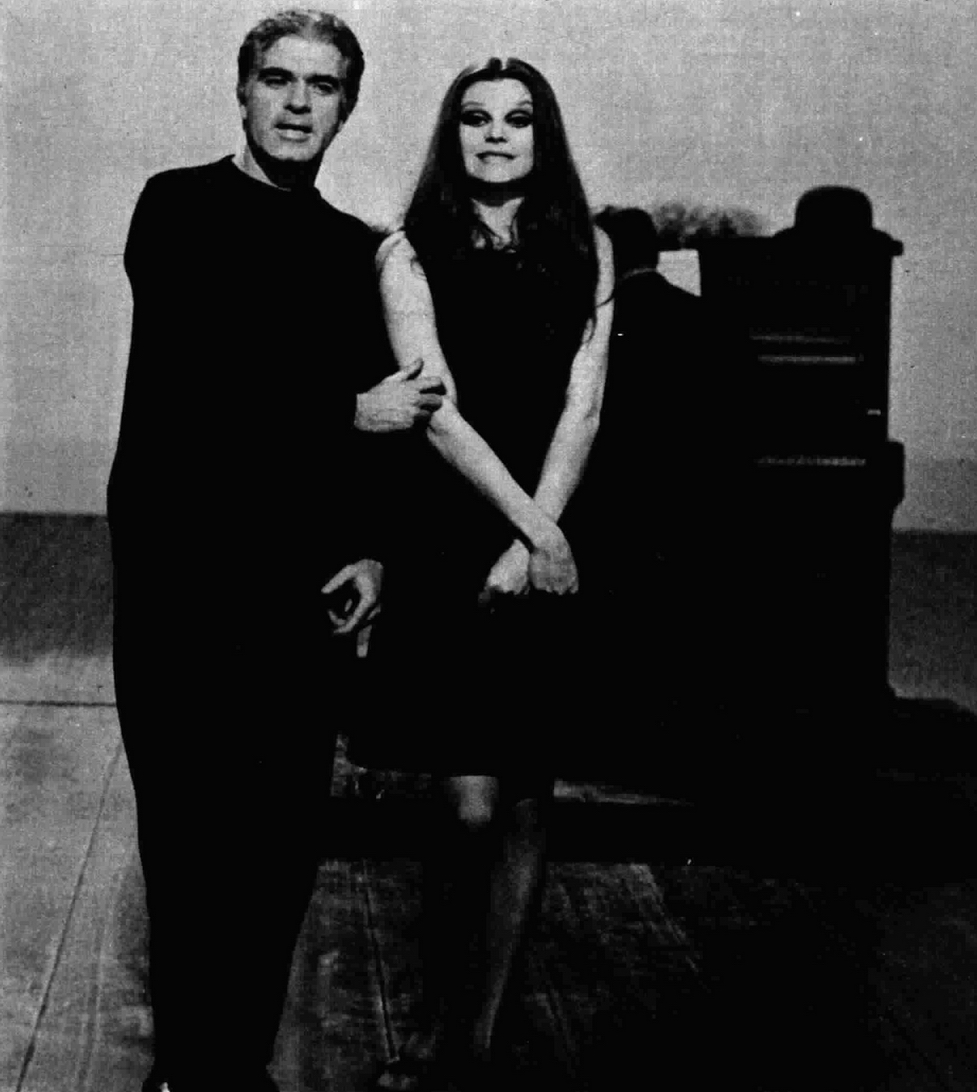
Milva and Giorgio Strehler

1981 saw the commencement of a collaboration between Milva and Greek composer Vangelis, with whom she has collaborated on several occasions. The 1981 collaboration would result in the release of both a French and a German language album. The first, sung in German, was Ich hab' keine Angst. It was released in Germany, Austria, Japan and South Korea, and produced the German 7" single Ich hab' keine Angst/Christine. The title song, Ich hab' keine Angst, is based on Vangelis' composition To the Unknown Man, a song which, in French, would become the title of her next album of 1981, Moi, je n'ai pas peur, which was released in France, and covered the songs included on the German release.

In 1982, Milva starred in the role of Veronica in the Italian film Via degli specchi, a crime-drama film directed by Giovanna Gagliardo. The film was entered into the 33rd Berlin International Film Festival. Later in the year, Milva released the German studio album Immer mehr, as well as the live double album Das Konzert. The album was released in Germany, Austria and Japan.

In 1983, Milva hosted an episode of the Italian variety show Al paradise, a television series directed by Antonello Falqui. That same year, Milva released the Italian language studio album Identikit, distributed in Italy under the Metronome label. She collaborated with Vangelis for the album, covering two of his songs; To the Unknown Man, this time recorded in Italian under the title Dicono di me, as well as an Italian language version of I'll Find My Way Home. Later that year, she released the studio album Unverkennbar, an album sung entirely in German. In 1984, the single Vielleicht war es Liebe/Eva was released in Germany. 1983 additionally saw the release of the original cast recording of the German ballet chanté Die sieben Todsünden der Kleinbürger (The Seven Deadly Sins [of the Petty Bourgeoisie]), which had been recorded in Berlin in January 1981. The cast recording featured all nine movements of the musical in which Milva had starred two years earlier, in the leading roles of Anna I and Anna II. In 1990, the album was re-released in Japan.

On 29 September 1984, Milva performed with Argentine tango composer, arranger and bandoneón player Ástor Piazzolla and his quintet, the Quintette de tango contemporain, at the Théâtre des Bouffes du Nord, in Paris, France. A recording of the performance would become the basis of Milva's next album and would mark the beginning of a series of future collaborations with Ástor Piazzolla in which Milva interpreted the composer's nuevo tango compositions. Later that year, Milva released the live album Milva & Ástor Piazzolla – Live at the Bouffes du Nord, released in collaboration with Ástor Piazzolla. The album featured nuevo tango compositions composed by Piazzolla and sung by Milva, in a musical style that incorporates elements from jazz and classical music, with Piazzolla accompanying his quintet on his bandoneón. Milva interpreted his compositions in French, Italian and Spanish. The album was published in Argentina, Japan, France, Germany and Italy.

On 1 January 1985, she released the studio album Mut zum Risiko, an album containing schlager and europop musical styles. It was released in Germany on the Metronome and Bertelsmann Club labels. The release of singles Die Kraft unserer Liebe/Du bist ein Freund and Nein – Ich ergeb mich nicht/Rosa soon followed.

In April 1985, Milva participated in the Italian supergroup Musicaitalia per l'Etiopia, recording Domenico Modugno's Volare (Nel blù di pinto di blù) as part of a fundraising effort for the benefit of those affected by the 1983–85 famine in Ethiopia. A 12" single and an EP were released.

Over the course of the same year, she released Corpo a Corpo, a studio album infused with schlager, italo-disco, europop, and synthpop influences. The album was released in Italy, Japan and Germany. The album produced the single Marinero, an italo-disco pop song sung in English, released in Italy, Germany, Japan and Spain in various 7" and 12" formats.

In March 1986, Milva played the role of Renata Palozzi in the French film Mon beau-frère a tué ma soeur (My Brother-in-law Killed My Sister), a film by Jacques Rouffio which received a nomination for a Golden Bear Award at the Berlin International Film Festival.

In 1986, Milva returned to collaborating with Greek composer Vangelis, five years after her success with Ich hab' keine Angst and Moi, je n'ai pas peur. This new collaboration would result in the release of two new studio albums, one in Italian and one in German; Tra due sogni and Geheimnisse. The studio album Tra due sogni was released on the Metronome label in Germany, Greece, Spain, Japan and Argentina. In Italy, it was released on the Dischi Ricordi label, while in France it was released on the Polydor label. It was released in Argentina as Tra Due Sogni – Entre Dos Sueños on the Polydor label in 1987. The album spawned three singles; the Maxi single Canto a Lloret, released in Italy, the 7" single Canto a Lloret/Blue Notte, released in France on the Barclay label, as well as the 7" single Canto a Lloret/Spring, Summer, Winter and Fall, which was released by the Polydor label in Spain. The album was released on the Seven Seas label in Japan in 1987, and was reissued in 1992. Shortly after the release of Tra due sogni, Milva recorded a German version of the album, entitled Geheimnisse, which was released on the Metronome label. The album contained German versions of the songs presented on Tra due sogni, plus one song, Venedig im Winter, which was omitted from the Italian version. The Italian version, Tra due sogni, contained an Italian language version of the song Da oben ist sein Zimmer, In sogno, which had appeared on her 1981 album Ich hab' keine Angst. Geheimnisse produced two 7" singles; Du gibst mir mehr/Etwas mehr and Deine Frau/Arie, both released in West Germany on the Metronome label in 1986. Vangelis was credited with composing all songs on both Tra due sogni and Geheimnisse and was credited as the arranger on the songs "Canto a Lloret" (Du gibst mir mehr), "Cuori di passagio" (Wunche) and "L'Ultima Carmen" (Die letzte Carmen). Milva covered Spring, Summer, Winter and Fall, originally by Aphrodite's Child, in English, a track which appeared on both Italian and German versions of the album. She also covered Bizet's Habanera.

In 1988, Milva released the studio album Unterwegs nach Morgen, written by Tony Carey and Peter Maffay, released in Germany and Japan, on the Metronome and Seven Seas labels, respectively. In the album, she covered Tony Carey's Wenn der Wind sich dreht and Melanie Safka's To Be a Star in German, titled Wer niemals stirbt. The album spawned three singles; Wenn der Wind sich dreht, released in both Maxi single and 7" formats, as well as Komm zurück zu mir, released in 7" format, all of which were released in Germany. Following the success of Wenn der Wind sich dreht, Milva recorded an Italian version of the song called Vento di Mezzanotte, which was released as a 7" single by the same name, under the Metronome label, in the Netherlands. Vento di Mezzanotte also appeared on the Italian album Milva, published under the Ricordi label, in the same year.

At the end of 1988, Milva appeared in the French film Prisonnières (Women in Prison), a crime drama written and directed by Charlotte Silvera, in the role of Lucie Germon, a prisoner in a women's prison who has given up on life and fears the day of her release. The film was released on 12 October 1988.

In 1989, she appeared in Ludi Boeken's film Wherever You Are..., playing the role of a wife of an Italian diplomat. That same year, Milva returned to collaborating with composer Franco Battiato, producing a total of three studio albums containing synth-pop arrangements, in which Milva sings in Italian, Spanish, French and German. This collaboration between Milva and Battiato produced the studio album Svegliando l'amante che dorme, released in Italy. Milva also recorded the album in Spanish, with the album released as Una historia inventada, released in Spain later that year. The Spanish version of the album generated the 7" single Una historia inventada, which was released in Spain.

In December 1989, Milva participated for a second time in the Italian supergroup Musicaitalia in a fundraising project organised and spearheaded by Charles Aznavour for the benefit of those affected by the 1988 earthquake in Armenia, contributing vocals for the song Per te, Armenia, which was released as a single. Two music videos to accompany the song were later recorded and released in May 1990 as part of the fundraising effort.

In 1990, the Italian version of the album was released in Japan under the original Italian title but contained two additional tracks that were not present on the original Italian release; Via lattea and Centro di gravità permanente, the latter of which is a duet with Battiato. The album was also released as Una Storia Inventata [Eine erfundene geschichte] in Germany.

=== 1990s ===
In 1990, Milva returned to the Sanremo Music Festival for the first time since 1974, this time competing with Sono felice, a song written and composed by Rosalino Cellamare, finishing in 4th place. On 3 October 1990, Milva released the German language studio album, Ein Kommen und Gehen. The album contained pop/rock ballads and a cover of Udo Lindenberg's Ein Kommen und Gehen, which was also released as a single. For the album, Milva collaborated with German songwriters and composers Udo Lindenberg, Peter Maffay, Udo Jürgens, Herbert Grönemeyer, Heinz Rudolf Kunze, Roland Kaiser and Tony Carey. The album was produced by German producers Edo Zanki and Vilko Zanki and was considered a success.

The following year, on 27 September 1991, Milva released the studio album Gefühl und Verstand, an album containing pop/rock ballads sung in German.

In 1992, Ich weiß es selber nicht genau and Mein Weg mit dir, two singles recorded by Milva, were released in Germany.

In 1993, Milva released the studio album Uomini addosso, which was released in Italy, Germany, Japan and Spain. The title track of the album, Uomini addosso, was presented by Milva at the Sanremo Music Festival. Two songs from the German and Japanese editions of the album, Se ti va and Le ombre del giardino, written by G. Conte and Natale Massara, were used as the opening and closing theme songs of the 1993 Italian mini television series Private Crimes (Delitti privati).

Later in the year, she starred as the protagonist in the acting and singing role of Zazà, in the Italian musical La Storia di Zazà (The Story of Zaza), a stage musical directed by Giancarlo Sepe and produced by the Comunità teatrale di Italia, premiering on 26 October 1993, at the Teatro Nuovo di Milano. An original cast recording of the musical was produced and an album was released as Milva in La Storia di Zazà, with music composed by Stefano Marcucci and lyrics written by Giancarlo Sepe, on the Hollywood Records (Italy) label. The album, however, only saw a limited release.

In 1994, Milva collaborated on the promotional album Milva in Café Chantant, a studio album featuring Café-chantant-inspired songs recorded in studio by Milva in Italian and Napolitan, with music arranged by Italian film composer and arranger Natale Massara. The musical release was part of the promotional Café chantant volumes distributed to the public by the Italian coffee manufacturer Lavazza. The overall theme of the album was coffee, with songs arranged and presented in a belle époque and nuevo tango style. In the album, Milva performs Édith Piaf's 1956 song Les amants d'un jour in Italian language as Albergo an Ore, with lyrics translated by Herbert Pagani, a song Milva had once recorded in 1970 for her album Canzoni di Édith Piaf, and interprets Venezuelan composer Hugo Blanco's Moliendo café with Italian lyrics, in addition to 'A tazza 'e café, a song made famous by Claudio Villa, in Napolitan language. The album concludes with Milva's EuroPop song Im Schatten der Träume, a song she had previously released on her 1991 German album Gefühl und Verstand.

In 1994, Milva collaborated with German composer and big band leader James Last, releasing the studio album Milva & James Last – Dein ist mein ganzes Herz, in which she sings a number of pop ballads and classical-oriented pieces in German, Italian and French. Milva had previously worked with James Last, who arranged a cover of Manos Haddidakis' Greek folksong The Children of Piraeus, popularly known in English as Never on Sunday, which she sang in German and was released on James Last's 1982 album Nimm mich mit, Käpt'n James, auf die Reise, under the title of Ein Schiff wird kommen. Milva had previously covered the song in Italian, twice. In Dein ist mein ganzes Herz, she covered a version of the title song, known in English as "Yours Is My Heart Alone" or "You Are My Heart's Delight", an aria from the 1929 operetta The Land of Smiles (Das Land des Lächelns), with music composed by Franz Lehár and libretto by Fritz Löhner-Beda and Ludwig Herzer, arranged by James Last. In French, she covered French composer Georges Bizet's Les Pêcheurs de Perles. She sang the second movement of Spanish composer Joaquín Rodrigo's Concierto de Aranjuez, as well as an interpretation of Ombra mai fu, the opening aria from the 1738 opera Serse, by George Frideric Händel. In addition to other classical pieces composed by Russian composer Pyotr Ilyich Tchaikovsky and Czech composer Antonín Dvořák, all of which were arranged by James Last for the album, Milva covers some pop ballads, including a German interpretation of American recording artist Richard Marx's Now and Forever, under the title Immer und Ewig. She also covered Italian singer-songwriter Lucio Dalla's ballad, Caruso, a song dedicated to Italian tenor Enrico Caruso. In 1995, the album was released in Japan.

Beginning in 1994, Milva once again collaborated with Greek composer Thanos Mikroutsikos, releasing the studio album Volpe d'amore (Milva sings Thanos Mikroutsikos), an album featuring music composed by the composer and sung completely in Italian, with the exception of one song, Thalassa, which she sang in Greek. The album was released in Greece, Japan and Italy. In 1995, the album was re-released in Japan with the title Volpe d'amore and the album was subsequently re-released as Milva canta Thanos Mikroutsikos in 1998 with a new song replacing Volpe d'amore entitled Vento d'amore. In 2006, Volpe d'amore was re-released in Greece with the original album track listing.

Following the release of Volpe d'amore in 1994, Milva re-recorded the album in German, an album that was released in Germany under the title Tausendundeine Nacht, featuring the same orchestrations by Thanos Mikroutsikos. The title track featured a choir, differentiating it from Il canto di un'eneide diversa, its Italian-language counterpart.

In May 1994, she embarked on her fourteenth Japanese tour.

In 1995, Milva starred in the Werner Herzog television film Gesualdo: Death for Five Voices (Tod für fünf Stimmen), in a film inspired by the life and music of Carlo Gesualdo, portraying the role of Maria d'Atalos, the adulterous wife murdered by Gesualdo along with her lover. In the same year, she appeared in the Italian film Celluloide, a dramatic film directed and written by Carlo Lizzani, playing the role of an Italian countess, a portrayal that garnered her praise. Later that year, Milva was appointed Officer of the Order of Arts and Letters (Officier de l'Ordre des Arts et des Lettres) by the French Ministry of Culture.

In 1996, the album Milva canta un Nuovo Brecht produced by Jimmy Bowien was released in Germany. The album consisted of songs written by Bertolt Brecht and Giorgio Strehler set to music primarily composed by Kurt Weill, sung in German and Italian. In the same year, Milva released Fammi Luce – Milva ha incontrato Shinji, an album written by and recorded in collaboration with Japanese composer Shinji Tanimura. The album was released in Japan, Germany and Italy.

In September 1997, Milva released the album Mia Bella Napoli, a studio album in which she interpreted covers of Napolitan folksongs in the Napolitan language.

In 1998, she sang with Alexia Vassiliou on Alexia's album, Alexia – Mikis Theodorakis, a double album with new approaches to 26 Mikis Theodorakis compositions.

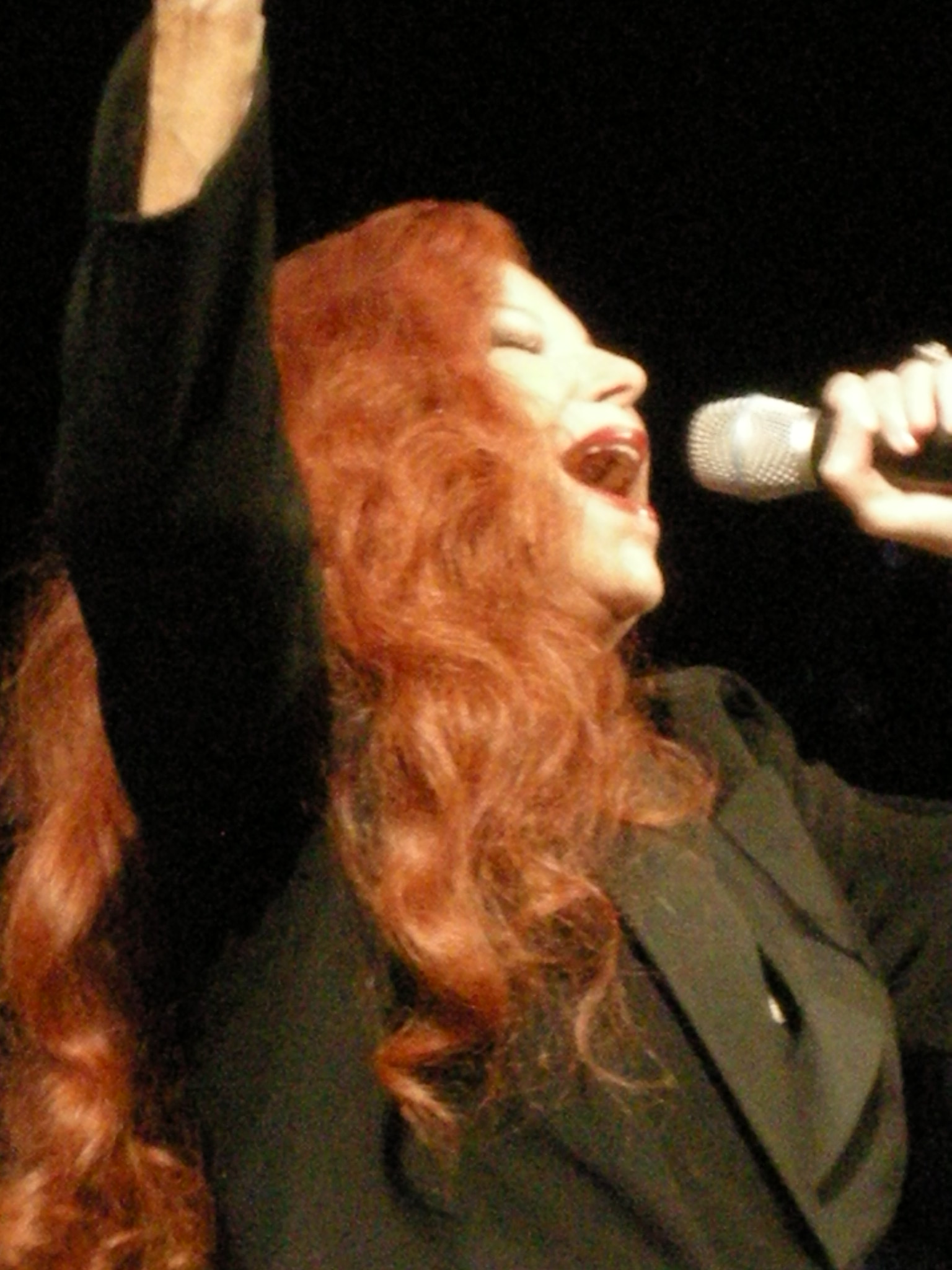
Milva performing live, 31 January 2009

In 1999, Milva released Stark sein, a studio album produced by Chris Flanger and Isabel Silverstone and sung in the German language. In the album, Milva covered Amália Rodrigues' fado song Canção do mar in German, titled as Das ja zum Leben. She also duetted with Italian singer Al Bano Carrisi, recording a new version of Io di notte, in German and in Italian under the title Zuviel nachte ohne dich (Io di notte), a duet of a song that both singers had individually recorded at the end of the 1960s. The duet also appeared on Al Bano's 1999 compilation album Grazie (Meine Schönsten Lieder – Meine Größten Erfolge). Stark sein was released in Europe under the BMG Ariola München label, and on the Seven Seas label in Japan.

=== 2000s ===
In 2001, Milva released the German studio album Artisti, in which she performed songs in German, Italian, Spanish and Latin. The album was released and distributed by BMG Ariola. In the album, she covered Julio Iglesias' "Abrázame", a Spanish language pop standard rewritten with German lyrics, titled Komm halt mich Fest, as well as an Italian-language cover of John Denver's Perhaps Love. She also performed Da troppo tempo, a song which she had previously recorded in Italian and competed with at the Sanremo Music Festival of 1973, finishing in 3rd place, this time in German. In Spanish, she sang Yo soy María, a song from Ástor Piazzolla's tango opera María de Buenos Aires. In Latin and Italian, she performed the classical aria Ave Maria, arranged and given to her by Ástor Piazzolla before his death.

In the same year, Milva released La chanson française, a studio album sung entirely in the French language, revisiting and covering songs from the French popular music repertoire originally composed and performed by Charles Aznavour, Gilbert Bécaud, Jacques Brel and Édith Piaf, some of which Milva had previously recorded in French, Italian and German at different points throughout her career. The album featured symphony orchestrations composed by Hubert Stuppner and performed by the Haydn Orchestra of Bolzano and Trento, under the conductorship of Peter Keuschnig. The album was first released in Italy on the Agorá label and then reissued on the Accademia Crossover label in 2004.

In 2004, Milva released the studio album Sono nata il 21 a Primavera – Milva canta Merini, an Italian-language album featuring the poetry of contemporary Italian poet Alda Merini, whose poetry was set to music composed by Italian singer and composer Giovanni Nuti and interpreted by Milva in sung form. The album was subsequently released in Japan and Germany.

In May of the same year, Milva performed Milva canta Merini, a series of recitals at the Teatro Stehler di Milano of the Piccolo Teatro di Milano, in collaboration with Alda Merini and Giovanni Nuti, in which Milva performed the songs from her album Sono nata il 21 a Primavera, released earlier that year. Milva again performed a concert at the Teatro Strehler di Milano in 2005, a performance that was recorded and released on the live DVD Milva canta Merini – Live, in March 2006.

In 2006, Milva was awarded the Grand Cross 1st Class of the Bundesverdienstkreuz, the Order of Merit of the Federal Republic of Germany (Verdienstorden der Bundesrepublik Deutschland) by the then President of the Federal Republic of Germany Horst Köhler, in "recognition and appreciation of her extraordinary career and artistry in Germany". The medal was personally presented to her by German President Horst Köhler on Thursday, 2 June 2006.

In February 2007, Milva released the single The Show Must Go On, a song written and composed by Giorgio Faletti, published in anticipation of her upcoming album. On 27 February 2007, she performed The Show Must Go On at the 2007 edition of the Sanremo Music Festival, finishing the 57th edition of the competition in 16th place.

On 2 March 2007, Milva released the studio album In territorio nemico, an Italian-language album written, composed and produced by Giorgio Faletti.

On 2 June 2007, in Rome, Milva was made Commander of the Order of Merit of the Italian Republic (Ordine al merito della Repubblica italiana), the highest ranking honour and most senior order of the Republic of Italy, an honour bestowed upon her by the then President of the Italian Republic Giorgio Napolitano, for her "intense and luminous career" during which she went from music to theatre performances, cinema, to lyric opera.

Milva was made Knight (Chevalier) of the National Order of the Legion of Honour of the French Republic in 2009. The knighthood was conferred upon her by French ambassador to Italy, Jean-Marc de La Sablière, who presented the honour to her at a ceremony held on 11 September 2009 at the Palazzo Farnese in Rome.

In 2010, Milva released the studio album Non Conosco Nessun Patrizio! – Dieci canzoni di Franco Battiato. The album marked her third produced in collaboration with Italian composer Franco Battiato. Milva had previously collaborated with Battiato on her 1982 Italian album Milva e dintorni, and its French-language counterpart released the same year, as well as on her 1989 album Svegliando l'amante che dorme (released and known as Una storia inventata [Eine Erfundene Geschichte]) in Germany, and Una storia inventada, its Spanish-language counterpart. In this album, Milva performed nine new versions of songs written and composed by Battiato that she had previously recorded in 1989, in addition to two newly composed songs. The title song, Non Conosco Nessun Patrizio! is based on a text written by philosopher Manlio Sgalambro. The album was produced by Fonit Cetra and distributed by Universal Music.

In 2011, Milva released the Italian album La Variante di Lüneburg [Fabula in Musica], composed by Valter Sivilotti and written by Paolo Maurensig, in which she performed with actor Walter Mramor the songs from the musical La Variante di Lüneburg. It was released on the Artesuono label.

On 2 March 2012, Milva released the German single Der Mensch, der Dich liebt, a single containing two songs composed by Sascha Merlin and Kersten Kenan.

== Personal life ==
Milva had a daughter, Martina, born during her marriage to Maurizio Corgnati in the early 1960s.

She also dated film star Luigi Pistilli for four years; Pistilli committed suicide.

On 23 April 2021, Milva died at her Milan home.

== Discography ==
=== Albums ===
==== Studio albums ====
- 14 Successi di Milva (1961)
- Milva canta per voi (1962)
- Da Il Cantatutto con Milva e Villa (1963)
- Le Canzoni del Tabarin – Canzoni da Cortile (1963)
- Canti della libertà (1965)
- Milva (1965)
- Milva (1966)
- Milva (1967)
- Tango (1968)
- Un sorriso (1969)
- Tango Inspirationen (1969)
- Ritratto di Milva (1970)
- Milva Canta Brecht (1971)
- Dedicato a Milva da Ennio Morricone (1972)
- Love Feeling in Japan (ミルバ日本の愛を歌う) (Milva, Nippon no ai o utau) (1972)
- Sognavo, amore mio (1973, lyrics and music by Francis Lai)
- Sono matta da legare (1974)
- Libertà (1975)
- Milva Brecht Volume 2 (1975)
- Auf den Flügeln bunter Träume (1977)
- Milva (1977)
- Von Tag zu Tag (1978, with Mikis Theodorakis)
- La Mia Età (1979, with Mikis Theodorakis)
- Was ich denke (1979)
- Wenn wir uns wiederseh'n (1979)
- Attends, la vie (1980, with Mikis Theodorakis)
- La rossa (1980, with Enzo Jannacci)
- Milva International (1980)
- Ich hab' keine Angst (1981, with Vangelis)
- Moi, je n'ai pas peur (1981, with Vangelis)
- Immer mehr (1982)
- Milva e dintorni (1982, with Franco Battiato)
- Milva e dintorni (1982, with Franco Battiato, French version)
- Identikit (1983)
- Unverkennbar (1983)
- Corpo a corpo (1985)
- Mut zum Risiko (1985)
- Geheimnisse (1986, with Vangelis)
- Tra due sogni (1986, with Vangelis)
- Milva Canta Della Giapponesi (1987)
- Milva – Vento di Mezzanotte (1988)
- Unterwegs nach Morgen (1988, written by Tony Carey & Peter Maffay)
- Svegliando l'amante che dorme (1989, with Franco Battiato, Italian version)
- Una storia inventata (1989, with Franco Battiato, German version)
- Una historia inventada (1989, with Franco Battiato, Spanish version)
- Ein Kommen und Gehen (1990)
- Gefühl & Verstand (1991)
- Uomini addosso (1993)
- Café Chantant (1994)
- Milva & James Last – Dein ist mein ganzes Herz (1994)
- Volpe d'amore (Milva sings Thanos Mikroutsikos) (1994)
- Tausendundeine Nacht (1995)
- Fammi Luce – Milva ha incontrato Shinji (Tanimura) (1996)
- Milva Canta un Nuovo Brecht (1996)
- Mia Bella Napoli (1997)
- Stark sein (1999)
- Artisti (2001)
- La chanson française (2004)
- Milva canta Merini (2004, lyrics by Alda Merini, music by Giovanni Nuti)
- In territorio nemico (2007, lyrics and music by Giorgio Faletti)
- Non conosco nessun Patrizio! (2010, music by Franco Battiato)
- La variante di Lüneburg (2011)

==== Live albums ====
- Milva / Villa – Concert in Japan (1968)
- Milva on Stage – Live in Tokyo at Serkey Hall (1970)
- Milva in Seoul (1972)
- Canzoni Tra Le Due Guerre (1978)
- Das Konzert (1982)
- Milva & Ástor Piazzolla – Live at the Bouffes du Nord (1984)
- Das Beste Milva Live (1988)
- Milva Dramatic Recital '92 (Best Live in Japan) (1992)
- Milva Dramatic Recital '92 – Canzoni tra le due guerre (Al Tokyo Metropolitan Art Space) (1992)
- El Tango de Ástor Piazzolla live in Japan (1998)
- Lili Marleen – Best live in Japan (1992)
- Live and More (1988, Milva Collectors' Club, limited edition album)
- Milva & Ástor Piazzolla – Live in Tokyo 1988 (2009)
- Milva canta Brecht (Live) (2010)

==== Soundtracks and cast recordings ====
- Angeli in bandiera (1969, with Gino Bramieri)
- Die sieben Todsünden der Kleinbürger (1983)
- The Threepenny Opera (1989) as Pirate Jenny
- La storia di Zaza (1994)
- Hommage à Ástor Piazzolla (with Tangoseís) (2000)

==== Compilation albums ====
- Milva (1966)
- Milva singt Tangos deutsch und italienisch (1969)
- Milva (1972)
- La filanda e altre storie (1972)
- Milva (1975)
- Portrait (1975)
- Canzoni da cortile / Le canzoni del Tabarin (1976)
- Canzone dall' Italia (1976)
- Canti della libertà (1976)
- Gold (1976)
- Special 3000 (1976)
- Starlight (1976)
- I successi di Milva (1976)
- The Original (1976)
- Ein Portrait (1978)
- Schön war's heute Abend (1979)
- Star Edition (1979)
- Star Gold Super (1980)
- Hit Parade International (1982)
- Milva Vol. 2 (1983)
- Milva Vol. 3 (1983)
- Tango (1983)
- Canzoni di Edith Piaf (1983)
- Gesichter eine Frau (1984)
- Tango – Gefühl und Leidenschaft (1984)
- Grandi Scelte (1987)
- I successi di Milva
- Milva (1990)
- Mon amour... sono canzoni d'amore (1992)
- Milva History 1960–1990 (1992)
- Meisterstücke (1993)
- I successi (1995)
- I successi di Milva (1995)
- Mein Weg mit dir – Goldene Geschenksausgabe (1995)
- Meisterstücke II (1996)
- Balladen (1996)
- Gli anni d'oro (1997)
- I grandi successi (1997)
- Selbstbewusst (1997)
- La favolosa Milva (1999)
- Milva canta le sue più belle canzoni (1999)
- I grandi successi originali (2000)
- Il fascino della voce (2000)
- In Gedanken (2000)
- Die unvergessliche Milva (2000)
- Grosse Gefühle – Con tutti emotioni (2000)
- Milva (2000)
- Meisterstücke (2000)
- Die grossen Erfolge – Nur das Beste (2001)
- Ich hab' keine Angst (2001)
- Ganz viel Liebe (2001)
- Le signore della canzone / Il giornale (2003)
- Mein Weg (Stationen Einer Karriere 1977–98) (2004)
- Best Collection (2006)
- Classics (2006)
- The Best of Milva (2006)
- Le più belle di... Milva (2007)
- Tutto Milva (La Rossa) (2007)
- Flashback (2009)
- Una storia così (2011)
- Le più belle di sempre / L'immensità (2011)
- Glanzlichter (2011)

=== Songs ===
- 1960 Flamenco Rock
- 1960 Les Enfants du Pirée (Uno a te, uno a me)
- 1960 Milord
- 1960 Arlecchino gitano
- 1961 Il mare nel cassetto
- 1961 Al di la
- 1961 Tango della gelosia
- 1961 Venise que j'aime by Jean Cocteau
- 1961 Il primo mattino del mondo
- 1961 Et maintenant
- 1962 Tango italiano
- 1962 Quattro vestiti by Ennio Morricone
- 1962 Stanotte al luna park
- 1962 La risposta della novia
- 1962 Abat-jour
- 1963 Ricorda
- 1963 Non sapevo
- 1963 Balocchi e Profumi
- 1963 Tango delle capinere
- 1965 Bella ciao
- 1966 Nessuno di voi
- 1966 Blue Spanish Eyes
- 1966 Little Man
- 1966 Tamburino, ciao
- 1967 Dipingi un mondo per me
- 1967 Love Is a Feeling (Co-composed by Pino Donaggio) / Seasons of Love
- 1968 Canzone by Don Backy
- 1969 Un Sorriso
- 1970 Iptissam
- 1970 Canzoni di Edith Piaf
- 1971 Surabaya Johnny
- 1971 La Filanda
- 1972 È per colpa tua
- 1973 Da troppo tempo
- 1974 Monica delle bambole
- 1977 Non piangere più Argentina by Andrew Lloyd Webber
- 1978 Zusammenleben by Mikis Theodorakis
- 1979 Typisch Mann
- 1979 Libertà (Freiheit in meiner Sprache)
- 1980 La Rossa by Enzo Jannacci
- 1981 Alexanderplatz by Franco Battiato
- 1981 Poggibonsi by Franco Battiato
- 1981 Ich hab keine Angst by Vangelis
- 1981 Du hast es gut
- 1982 Immer mehr
- 1982 Wieder mal
- 1983 Hurra, wir leben noch
- 1985 Die Kraft unserer Liebe
- 1985 Nein ich ergeb mich nicht
- 1985 Marinero
- 1986 Du gibst mir mehr (Canto a Lloret)
- 1988 Wenn der Wind sich dreht
- 1988 Komm zurück zu mir
- 1989 Potemkin by Franco Battiato
- 1990 Sono felice
- 1990 Ein Kommen und Gehen
- 1992 Ich weiß es selber nicht genau
- 1993 Mein Weg mit dir
- 1993 Uomini addosso
- 1994 Caruso by Lucio Dalla
- 1995 Tausendundeine Nacht
- 1995 Flauten & Stürme
- 1998 Rinascerò by Ástor Piazzolla
- 2004 Sona Nata il 21 a Primavera by Alda Merini and Giovanni Nuti
- 2004 I Sandali by Alda Merini and Giovanni Nuti
- 2007 The Show Must Go On (lyrics and music by Giorgio Faletti)
- 2007 Jacques
- 2012 Der Mensch, der Dich Liebt by Sascha Merlin and Kersten Kenan

== Sanremo Music Festival ==
This is a list of Sanremo Music Festival contests which Milva entered. Milva participated 15 times in the annual music festival, tying the record for most participations (as of 2023) with Al Bano, Anna Oxa, Peppino di Capri and Toto Cutugno.

Year	Song	Partner	Writer(s)	Place	Ref
1961	"Il mare nel cassetto"	Gino Latilla	Piero Carlo Rolla; Eligio La Valle, Fernando Lattuada	3	
1962	"Tango italiano"	Sergio Bruni	Bruno Pallesi, Walter Malgoni; Sergio Bruni	2	
1962	"Stanotte al Luna Park"	Miriam del Mare	Vito Pallavicini, Biri; Carlo Alberto Rossi	5	
1963	"Ricorda"	Luciano Tajoli	Carlo Donida; Mogol	5	
1963	"Non sapevo"	Gianni Lecommare	Pino Calvi; Bruno Pallesi	10	
1964	"L'ultimo tram"	Frida Boccara	Giorgio Calabrese; Eros Sciorilli	N.F.	
1965	"Vieni con noi"	Bernd Spier	Franco Maresca; Mario Pagano	12	
1966	"Nessuno di voi"	Richard Anthony	Gorni Kramer; Vito Pallavicini	9	
1967	"Uno come noi"	Los Bravos	Umberto Martucci, Giorgio Bertero; Marino Marini	N.F.	
1968	"Canzone"	Adriano Celentano	Don Backy; Don Backy, Detto Mariano	3	
1969	"Un sorriso"	Don Backy	Aldo Caponi; Detto Mariano	3	
1972	"Mediterraneo"	—	Luigi Albertelli; Enrico Riccardi	12	
1973	"Da troppo tempo"	—	Gene Colonnello; Luigi Albertelli	3	
1974	"Monica delle bambole"	—	Luciano Beretta; Elide Suligoj	4 ^{‡}	
1990	"Sono felice"	Sandie Shaw	Rosalino Cellamare	4 ^{‡}	
1993	"Uomini addosso"	—	Roby Facchinetti; Valerio Negrini	N.F.	
2007	"The Show Must Go On"	—	Giorgio Faletti	16	
"—" denotes that Milva entered the contest as a soloist. "^{‡}" Denotes a tie.

NOTE: N.F. signifies that the song did not qualify for the main event.

== Filmography ==
Film
Year	Title	Role	Director	Notes
1962	Canzoni a tempo di twist	Herself	Stefano Canzio	Cameo
1962	La bellezza di Ippolita	Adriana	Giancarlo Zagni	
1962	Appuntamento in riviera	Herself	Mario Mattoli	Cameo
1963	Mondo Cane 2	Singing voice	Gualtiero Jacopetti	
1963	Lieder klingen am Lago Maggiore	Singer Milva	Hans Grimm	Cameo
1972	D'amore si muore	Leyla	Carlo Carunchio	Also soundtrack performer with "Si muore d'amore"
1980	Il gioco del giallo	Daughter	Corrado Farina	Short film
1983	Via degli specchi	Veronica	Giovanna Gagliardo	
1984	Illusione	Sarah Schupita	Victor J. Tognola	
1986	My Brother-in-Law Killed My Sister	Renata Palozzi	Jacques Rouffio	
1988	Wherever You Are	Diplomat's Wife	Krzysztof Zanussi	Cameo
1988	Prisoners	Lucie Germon	Charlotte Silvera	
1991	Amaurose	Irene	Dieter Funk	
1996	Celluloide	Countess	Carlo Lizzani	Final film role

Television
Year	Title	Role	Notes
1962–1963	Carosello	Coffee promoter	Sketch comedy series
1963–1964	Cantatutto	Herself / Co-host	Variety show
1964	Biblioteca di Studio Uno	Calypso	Episode: "Odissea"
1965	Milva Club	Herself / Host	Special
1968	Senza rete	Herself / Performer	Variety show
1968	Milva racconta Milva	Herself / Host	Special
1970	Milva: Omaggio a Edith Piaf	Herself / Performer	Special
1971	Mai di sabato signora Lisistrata	Lisistrata	Television film
1977	Auditorio A	Herself / Performer	Episode 5
1980–1981	Palcoscenico	Herself / Host	Variety show
1982	Buonasera con…	Herself / Host	Variety show (season 33)
1983	Al Paradise	Herself / Co-host	Variety show (season 1)
1986	Cena per lui	Herself	Television film (archive footage)
1988	Di che vizio sei?	Herself / Co-host	Variety show
1995	Gesualdo: Death for Five Voices	Ghost of Maria d'Avalos	Television film
2002	Liebesau – Die andere Heimat	Frau Agniollini	Episode: "Episode 2"
2004–2008	Willkommen bei Carmen Nebel	Herself	4 episodes
2024	Milva, diva per sempre	Herself	Special; posthumous release

== Honours ==
Chevalier of the National Order of the Legion of Honour of the French Republic — Paris, 11 September 2009

Commander of the Order of Merit of the Italian Republic — Rome, by President of the Italian Republic Giorgio Napolitano, 2 June 2007

Officer of the Order of Merit of the Federal Republic of Germany — Berlin, 2006

Officier of the Ordre des Arts et des Lettres — Paris, 1995

== See also ==
- List of Milva songs
- List of Italian actresses
- List of Légion d'honneur recipients by name
- List of foreign recipients of the Légion d'Honneur
- List of members of the Ordre des Arts et des Lettres
- Mononymous person
- The Threepenny Opera
- Sanremo Music Festival
