= The Police Commissioner =

- Directed by: Luigi Comencini
- Written by: Age & Scarpelli
- Produced by: Dino De Laurentiis
- Starring: Alberto Sordi
- Cinematography: Aldo Scavarda
- Edited by: Nino Baragli
- Music by: Carlo Rustichelli
- Release date: 1962
- Running time: 102 minutes
- Country: Italy
- Language: Italian

The Police Commissioner (Italian: Il commissario) is a 1962 Italian comedy film directed by Luigi Comencini.

== Cast ==
- Alberto Sordi as Vice Commissioner Dante Lombardozzi
- Franca Tamantini as Marisa Santarelli
- Alessandro Cutolo as Police Commissioner
- Alfredo Leggi as Armando Provetti
- Mino Doro as Colonel Menotti Di Pietro
- Franco Scandurra as Matarazzo
- Aldo Bufi Landi as Ettore Gargiulo
- Angela Portaluri as Maria De Santis
- Carlo Bagno as Dr. Longo
- Ennio Balbo as The Guest Speaker
