= Thickness =

Thickness may refer to:

- Thickness (graph theory)
- Thickness (geology), the distance across a layer of rock
- Thickness (meteorology), the difference in height between two atmospheric pressure levels
- Thickness planer a woodworking machine
- Optical thickness in optics
- Thickness, a concept in the game Go
- Thickness of a fluid, an informal name for viscosity

== See also ==
- Thick (disambiguation)
- Gauge (disambiguation)
- Size
- Width
