= The Ellen DeGeneres Show season 2 =

The Ellen DeGeneres Show
- Season 2
- Starring: Ellen DeGeneres
- No. of episodes: 180

Release
- Original release: September 6, 2004 – June 10, 2005

Season chronology
- ← Previous; Season 1 Next → Season 3

This is a list of episodes of the second season of The Ellen DeGeneres Show, which aired from September 2004 to June 2005.

== Episodes ==
No. overall	No. in season	Original release date	Guests
167	1	September 6, 2004	Season Premiere Noah Wyle, Kelly Clarkson, Scrubs
168	2	September 7, 2004	Reese Witherspoon, Brandy Norwood
169	3	September 8, 2004	Pamela Anderson, Tim McGraw
170	4	September 9, 2004	Matt LeBlanc, Nelly, Paul Hamm
171	5	September 10, 2004	Brad Garrett United States women's national gymnastics team
172	6	September 13, 2004	Josh Duhamel, Ken Jennings, Jason Mraz
173	7	September 14, 2004	Paris Hilton, Jill Scott
174	8	September 15, 2004	Farrah Fawcett, Andy Richter
175	9	September 16, 2004	Kirsten Dunst, Anita Baker, Scott Wolf
176	10	September 17, 2004	Jude Law, Edie Falco
177	11	September 20, 2004	Charlie Sheen, Jennifer Coolidge, Hazel Smith, Jim Parsons
178	12	September 21, 2004	Jon Stewart, Oliver Hudson
179	13	September 22, 2004	Gwyneth Paltrow, Mark McGrath, Brian Wilson
180	14	September 23, 2004	David Spade, Laura Dern, Ricky Fante
181	15	September 24, 2004	Naomi Watts, Angela Bassett
182	16	September 27, 2004	Lauren Graham, Peter Boyle, Patti Scialfa
183	17	September 28, 2004	Amy Brenneman, Keith Urban
184	18	September 29, 2004	Donald Trump, LL Cool J
185	19	September 30, 2004	Lance Armstrong, K.D. Lang
186	20	October 1, 2004	Rob Lowe, Fran Drescher
187	21	October 4, 2004	John Travolta, Mase
188	22	October 5, 2004	Leah Remini, Heart
189	23	October 6, 2004	Martin Short, Tyra Banks, Aron Ralston
190	24	October 7, 2004	Anthony LaPaglia, Joss Stone
191	25	October 8, 2004	Wanda Sykes, Carl Reiner
192	26	October 11, 2004	Ray Romano, Kaley Cuoco
193	27	October 12, 2004	Hilary Duff, Taye Diggs
194	28	October 13, 2004	Jimmy Fallon, Kyra Sedgwick
195	29	October 14, 2004	Annette Bening, Richard Marx, Nick Lachey
196	30	October 15, 2004	Robin Williams, Tears For Fears
197	31	October 18, 2004	Kelly Preston, Drew Carey
198	32	October 19, 2004	Queen Latifah, Rupert Everett
199	33	October 20, 2004	Martin Sheen, Drea DeMatteo
200	34	October 21, 2004	Susan Sarandon, Dermot Mulroney
201	35	October 22, 2004	Rod Stewart, Christina Applegate
202	36	October 25, 2004	Jason Alexander, Houston, Serena Williams
203	37	October 26, 2004	Courtney Thorne-Smith, Jimmy Kimmel
204	38	October 27, 2004	Anthony Lapaglia, Alanis Morissette, Amanda Bynes
205	39	October 28, 2004	James Spader, Debbie Reynolds
206	40	October 29, 2004	Halloween Show Alyssa Milano, David Copperfield, Elizabeth Mule
207	41	November 1, 2004	Roseanne Barr, Orlando Jones
208	42	November 2, 2004	Kevin James, Shannen Doherty
209	43	November 3, 2004	Teri Hatcher, Shane West
210	44	November 4, 2004	Will & Grace Cast
211	45	November 5, 2004	Samuel L. Jackson, David Ortiz, Rachel Bilson
212	46	November 8, 2004	Sir Elton John
213	47	November 9, 2004	Jamie Foxx, Jeffrey Tambor
214	48	November 10, 2004	Ashley Judd, Ruben Studdard
215	49	November 11, 2004	Kate Winslet, Chad Michael Murray, Thom Filicia
216	50	November 12, 2004	Teri Hatcher, Freddy Adu, Maroon 5
217	51	November 15, 2004	Woody Harrelson, Venus Williams, Jamie Oliver
218	52	November 16, 2004	Pierce Brosnan, Matthew Fox
219	53	November 17, 2004	Allison Janney, Alicia Keys
220	54	November 18, 2004	John Goodman, Marcia Cross, Nigella Lawson
221	55	November 19, 2004	Matt LeBlanc, Denise Richards
222	56	November 22, 2004	Jamie Lee Curtis, Fantasia
223	57	November 23, 2004	Tim Allen, Eva Longoria, Chingy
224	58	November 24, 2004	America's Soldier Tribute, Tom Hanks, Gwen Stefani
225	59	November 25, 2004	Brad Garrett, Jason Mraz, Carly Patterson
226	60	November 26, 2004	Jude Law, Ty Pennington
227	61	November 29, 2004	Colin Farrell, Lenny Kravitz
228	62	November 30, 2004	Robert Downey Jr., Christine Lahti
229	63	December 1, 2004	Angelina Jolie, Snoop Dogg, Pharrell Williams
230	64	December 2, 2004	Hilary Swank, Jason Randall
231	65	December 3, 2004	Julia Louis Dreyfuss, William H. Macy, Tatiana Totmianina, Maxim Marinin
232	66	December 6, 2004	Kevin Kline, Amy Poehler
233	67	December 7, 2004	Liam Neeson, George Lopez
234	68	December 8, 2004	Natalie Portman, Garry Marshall
235	69	December 9, 2004	Zach Braff, Parker Posey
236	70	December 10, 2004	Jane Kaczmarek, Jesse Metcalfe
237	71	December 13, 2004	Jon Cryer, Jessica Biel, Jerry Gordon
238	72	December 14, 2004	Stevie Wonder, Andy Dick
239	73	December 15, 2004	Melina Kanakaredes, Mekhi Phifer, Jem
240	74	December 16, 2004	Jeff Bridges, Lindsay Lohan, Holly Karolkowski
241	75	December 17, 2004	Celine Dion, Freddie Highmore
242	76	January 3, 2005	Ben Stiller, Sara Rue, Sarah McLachlan
243	77	January 4, 2005	Dustin Hoffman, Carmen Electra
244	78	January 5, 2005	Jimmy Smits, Laura Prepon
245	79	January 6, 2005	Jeff Goldblum, Kimberley Locke, Emma Roberts
246	80	January 7, 2005	Dennis Quaid, Jill Hennessy
247	81	January 10, 2005	Nicole Kidman, Jimmy Buffett
248	82	January 11, 2005	Don Cheadle, Betty White, Kratt Brothers
249	83	January 12, 2005	Scarlett Johansson, Carl Reiner
250	84	January 13, 2005	Steve Harvey, Jennifer Lopez
251	85	January 14, 2005	Michael Keaton, Oliver Platt, John Legend
252	86	January 17, 2005	Ryan Seacrest, JoJo, James Denton
253	87	January 18, 2005	Topher Grace, Evangeline Lilly
254	88	January 19, 2005	Susan Sarandon, Wyclef Jean, Enrique Murciano
255	89	March 11, 2005	Barry Manilow, Maria Bello
256	90	January 21, 2005	Minnie Driver, Treat Williams
257	91	January 24, 2005	Jimmy Smits, Joan Lunden
258	92	January 25, 2005	Ice Cube, Jen Schefft
259	93	January 26, 2005	Paris Hilton, Ciara
260	94	January 27, 2005	Paul Reiser, Helen Hunt, Elisabeth Shue
261	95	January 28, 2005	Bonnie Hunt, Kelly Clarkson
262	96	January 31, 2005	Susan Lucci, Tara Reid
263	97	February 1, 2005	Amy Brenneman, Faith Ford, Betty Erickson
264	98	February 2, 2005	Garry Shandling, Aisha Tyler, Houston
265	99	February 3, 2005	Kiefer Sutherland, Vanessa Marcil, Wilma McNabb
266	100	February 4, 2005	Cate Blanchett
267	101	February 7, 2005	Leah Remini, Ashanti
268	102	February 8, 2005	Lauren Graham, Alex Trebek, Christian Delpech
269	103	February 9, 2005	Tina Turner, Martin Sheen
270	104	February 10, 2005	Debra Messing, Rod Stewart, Jeffrey Tambor
271	105	February 11, 2005	William Shatner, Avril Lavigne, Rosie Perez
272	106	February 14, 2005	Allison Janney, Laura Linney, Loretta Lynn
273	107	February 15, 2005	Dennis Franz, Mo'Nique
274	108	February 16, 2005	Simon Cowell, Emily Procter
275	109	February 17, 2005	Noah Wylie, Sean Astin
276	110	February 18, 2005	Nicollette Sheridan, Jamie Kennedy
277	111	February 21, 2005	Ray Romano, Nicole Richie, Jesse McCartney
278	112	February 22, 2005	Chris Rock, Peter Boyle
279	113	February 23, 2005	Patricia Heaton, Benjamin McKenzie
280	114	February 24, 2005	Bob Newhart, Sean Hayes
281	115	February 25, 2005	Brad Garrett, Luke Perry, Jennie Garth
282	116	February 28, 2005	Diane Sawyer, Jeffrey Tambor
283	117	March 1, 2005	Vince Vaughn, Missy Elliott
284	118	March 2, 2005	John Travolta, Faye Dunaway
285	119	March 3, 2005	Jennifer Love Hewitt, Gerard Butler, Austin Preiss
286	120	March 4, 2005	Vin Diesel, 3 Doors Down, Annasophia Robb
287	121	March 7, 2005	The Rock, Vanessa Marcil
288	122	March 8, 2005	Bruce Willis, Constance Marie
289	123	March 9, 2005	Penélope Cruz, Carson Daly, Chelsea Dock
290	124	March 10, 2005	Mel Gibson, Joan Allen
291	125	March 11, 2005	Barry Manilow, Maria Bello
292	126	March 14, 2005	Michael Chiklis, Gavin DeGraw, Kristen Bell
293	127	March 15, 2005	Glenn Close, Kevin Pollak, Tori Amos
294	128	March 16, 2005	Kelsey Grammer, Brian Williams
295	129	March 17, 2005	John Stamos, Christina Milian
296	130	March 18, 2005	Adrien Brody, Sherri Shepherd
297	131	March 21, 2005	Andie MacDowell, Mike O'Malley
298	132	March 22, 2005	Ashton Kutcher, Julie Bowen, Fantasia Barrino, Fan Yang
299	133	March 23, 2005	Elijah Wood, Florence Henderson
300	134	March 24, 2005	300th Episode Sandra Bullock, Chris Kattan
301	135	March 25, 2005	Bernie Mac, Reba McEntire, Sum 41
302	136	April 4, 2005	Queen Latifah, Tim Daly
303	137	April 5, 2005	Kenneth Branagh, Lisa Marie Presley
304	138	April 6, 2005	Cynthia Nixon, John Spencer, Al Green
305	139	April 7, 2005	Kevin Costner, Michael Clarke Duncan
306	140	April 8, 2005	Whoopi Goldberg, Regina King
307	141	April 11, 2005	Brittany Murphy, Eric Idle, Ringside
308	142	April 12, 2005	Tom Selleck, Wendie Malick, Hall & Oates
309	143	April 13, 2005	Pamela Anderson, Anthony Anderson
310	144	April 14, 2005	Anthony Anderson, Maura Tierney
311	145	April 15, 2005	Ryan Seacrest, Fran Drescher
312	146	April 25, 2005	Anjelica Huston, Rob Thomas, Nadia Turner
313	147	April 26, 2005	Jason Alexander, Amy Yasbeck, Kenny Loggins, Jim Messina
314	148	April 27, 2005	Penny Marshall, Rob Morrow, Ellie Lawson, John Moceo
315	149	April 28, 2005	Owen Wilson, Vince Vaughn
316	150	April 29, 2005	Eric McCormack, Ty Pennington
317	151	May 2, 2005	Eric McCormack, Constantine Maroulis
318	152	May 3, 2005	Jay Leno, Jamie Lynn Spears
319	153	May 4, 2005	Matt Dillon, Betty White
320	154	May 5, 2005	Brendan Fraser
321	155	May 6, 2005	Paris Hilton, Kathy Hilton, Mekhi Phifer, Rhoda Phifer
322	156	May 9, 2005	Felicity Huffman, Neil Diamond, Scott Savol
323	157	May 10, 2005	Martin Short, Ellen Pompeo
324	158	May 11, 2005	Simon Cowell
325	159	May 12, 2005	Matt LeBlanc
326	160	May 13, 2005	Mariah Carey, Taye Diggs
327	161	May 16, 2005	Jennifer Lopez, Anthony Fedorov
328	162	May 17, 2005	Britney Spears and Kevin Federline
329	163	May 18, 2005	Gwen Stefani, Eve, Wanda Sykes, Kirstie Alley
330	164	May 19, 2005	Ray Romano, James Denton
331	165	May 20, 2005	Marcia Cross, Carson Daly
332	166	May 23, 2005	Goldie Hawn, Jimmy Smits, Gretchen Wilson
333	167	May 24, 2005	Matthew Fox, Jenny McCarthy
334	168	May 25, 2005	Peter Krause, Alanis Morissette, Jada Pinkett Smith
335	169	May 26, 2005	Il Divo, Lisa Kudrow, Linda Ellerbee
336	170	May 27, 2005	Helen Hunt, Nelly
337	171	May 30, 2005	Matt Lauer, Lee Ann Womack
338	172	May 31, 2005	Dustin Hoffman, Carmen Electra
339	173	June 1, 2005	Minnie Driver, Treat Williams
340	174	June 2, 2005	Susan Lucci, Tara Reid
341	175	June 3, 2005	Kiefer Sutherland, Poppy Montgomery
342	176	June 6, 2005	Charlie Sheen, Jennifer Coolidge
343	177	June 7, 2005	Usher, Dennis Franz, Mo'Nique
344	178	June 8, 2005	Russell Crowe, Carrie Underwood, Black Eyed Peas
345	179	June 9, 2005	Kevin James, Shannen Doherty
346	180	June 10, 2005	Garry Shandling, Aisha Tyler
