= Legend of the Lost =

1957 film

- 1957 movie poster
- Directed by: Henry Hathaway
- Screenplay by: Ben Hecht; Robert Presnell
- Produced by: Henry Hathaway; John Wayne
- Starring: John Wayne; Sophia Loren; Rossano Brazzi; Kurt Kasznar; Sonia Moser; Angela Portaluri; Ibrahim El Hadish
- Cinematography: Jack Cardiff
- Edited by: Bert Bates
- Music by: A.F. Lavagnino
- Production companies: Batjac Productions; Dear Film Productions
- Distributed by: United Artists
- Release date: December 17, 1957
- Running time: 109 minutes
- Countries: United States; Italy
- Language: English
- Budget: $1,500,000
- Box office: $2,200,000(domestic rentals)

Legend of the Lost is a 1957 Italian-American adventure film produced and directed by Henry Hathaway, shot in Technirama and Technicolor by Jack Cardiff, and starring John Wayne, Sophia Loren, and Rossano Brazzi. The location shooting for the film took place near Tripoli, Libya.

== Plot ==
In Timbuktu, experienced guide Joe January (John Wayne) reluctantly joins a Saharan treasure hunting expedition led by Paul Bonnard (Rossano Brazzi), a man obsessed with confirming his dead father's claim to have found a lost city. Dita (Sophia Loren), a woman of dubious reputation, becomes infatuated with Paul and his willingness to overlook her past. She invites herself along, despite Joe's protests. During the tough, dry ordeal, Joe and Dita become attracted to each other, raising tensions.

Just as they run out of water, they stumble upon the ancient city and a well. There, they find three human skeletons, a woman and two men. It becomes evident that Paul's father had found his woman in the arms of his guide, killed them and then himself. There is also no obvious treasure to be found. Paul's faith in his father is shattered and he becomes drunk.

However; they find the treasure after Joe deciphers the clues left by Paul's father in his bible. They load it and prepare to leave in the morning. Paul makes an attempt to seduce Dita; she rejects him and he gets into a fight with Joe, who protects her. Joe and Dita wake up to find that Paul had sneaked away during the night, taking all the animals, supplies and treasure with him and leaving his companions to die.

Joe and Dita pursue him on foot and eventually catch up. Paul is unconscious from dehydration. While Joe and Dita dig for desperately needed water, Paul regains consciousness. He buries the treasure and attacks Joe from behind with a knife. Dita shoots and kills Paul. When they spot a caravan approaching in the distance, Joe and Dita are saved.

== Cast ==
- John Wayne as Joe January
- Sophia Loren as Dita
- Rossano Brazzi as Paul Bonnard
- Kurt Kasznar as Prefect Dukas
- Sonia Moser as Girl
- Angela Portaluri as Girl
- Ibrahim El Hadish as Galli Galli

== Production ==
Legend of the Lost was directed by Henry Hathaway. Wayne and Hathaway worked together six times, beginning with The Shepherd of the Hills (1941) and ending with Wayne's Oscar-winning role in True Grit (1969). Co-author Robert Presnell, nearing the end of his career at this time, was one of Hollywood's most successful screenwriters. None of this talent managed to keep Legend of the Lost from being harshly reviewed by critics.

Hathaway said the main things wrong with the film were the script and the casting of Brazzi ("he can't play evil... the more I worked with him the worse he got.")

Wayne liked the location work in Rome and Libya. The plot is vaguely similar to another of Wayne’s movies crossing the Mojave Desert. The Roman remains of Leptis Magna in Libya were used extensively as a location for the ancient city. In the script Wayne's character refers to 'Timgad' in sardonic reference to the apparent delusions of Paul's father, despite the fact this places a considerable strain on the geography of the plot. The lost city of Timgad referred to in the film was actually the Leptis Magna ruins, a Roman city dating back to the 7th century B.C. near Tripoli, in northwest Libya, while "Timbuktu" was actually in Zliten, Libya. Headquarters for the film were located in Ghadames, where, according to the publicity material, citizens of the local villages were employed on set, as well as some native Tuaregs, an ancient desert tribe.

This film was Wayne's only collaboration on film with international cinema stars Sophia Loren and Rossano Brazzi.

The film was photographed by noted British cinematographer Jack Cardiff in Technicolor and Technirama (a wide-screen process developed by the Technicolor Corporation).

== Novelization ==
The film was novelized in 1957 by Bonnie Golightly.

== See also ==
- List of American films of 1957
- John Wayne filmography
