= Angela Portaluri =

Italian actress (1937–2024)

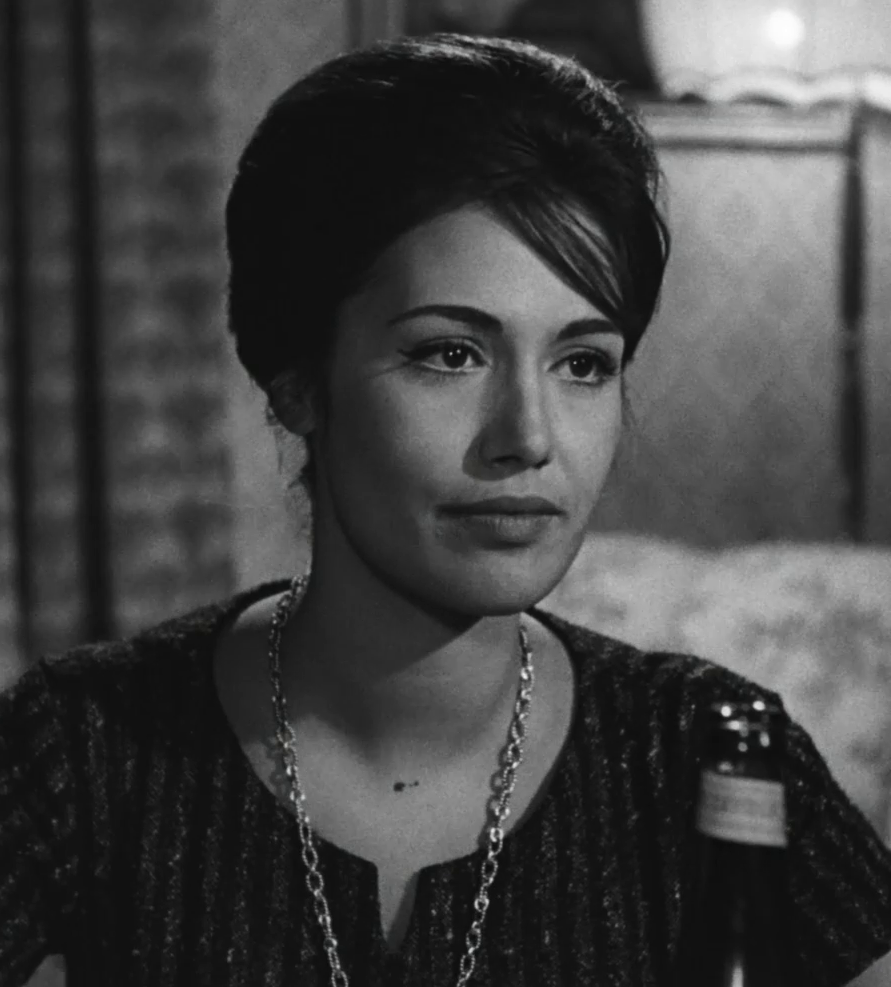
- Portaluri in Chi si ferma è perduto (1960)
- Born: 5 March 1937; Maglie, Italy
- Died: 28 October 2024 (aged 87); Lecce, Italy
- Occupations: Actress; model

Angela Portaluri (5 March 1937 – 28 October 2024) was an Italian actress and model. As an actress, she appeared in I mostri (1963) and Be Sick... It's Free (1968). She was the 1956 Italian candidate to Miss World, although she had not won the Miss Italia contest, and took part into several fotoromanzi.

Portaluri died in Lecce on 28 October 2024, at the age of 87.

== Filmography ==
- Legend of the Lost (1957)
- Le avventure di Robi e Buck (1958)
- ...And the Wild Wild Women (1959)
- The Tiger of Eschnapur (1959)
- The Indian Tomb (1959)
- Chi si ferma è perduto (1960)
- My Friend, Dr. Jekyll (1960)
- Girl with a Suitcase (1961)
- The Police Commissioner (1962)
- La bellezza di Ippolita (1962)
- I mostri (1963)
- Love Italian Style (1966)
- Born to Kill (1967)
- Be Sick... It's Free (1968)
- Anche per Django le carogne hanno un prezzo (1971)
- Amico mio, frega tu... che frego io! (1973)
