= Blockhead (film) =

1966 film

- Directed by: Giancarlo Zagni
- Written by: Fausto Tozzi
- Starring: Folco Lulli; Gigliola Cinquetti
- Cinematography: Aldo Scavarda
- Edited by: Renato May
- Music by: Piero Umiliani
- Release date: 1966
- Country: Italy
- Language: Italian

Blockhead (Italian: Testa di rapa, also spelled Testadirapa) is a 1966 Italian comedy film directed by Giancarlo Zagni. It was screened at the Venice Film Festival, in which it won the Leone di San Marco Plate.

== Plot ==
Set in Italy in the early 1860s, during the unification (Risorgimento) of the various Italian states into one kingdom, Testadirapa addresses the issue of compulsory education (usually in government-run schools): a concept that has just been introduced by the new national government in the name of the King. (The concept of the "King of Italy" is often mentioned in the film, because in that time and place, it was a new idea — as was compulsory education.) The main character is a stubborn, ignorant peasant known as "Tonio the Mule." Tonio is a widower with a young son, and he objects to the government forcing him to send his son to school. He says he wants the boy to stay home and help on their farm; he doesn't want the boy to get above himself; he doesn't think the government should be able to tell him how to bring up his son. The boy wants to go to school; finally, Tonio tries to keep him at home by literally putting him on a chain. The new national police (the "carabinieri") arrest Tonio. A gang of bandits takes pity on the little boy and offer to break Tonio out of jail, but when Tonio refuses to pledge full allegiance to the gang, they decide to leave him there to take the consequences of his stubbornness. At Tonio's trial, he is sentenced to six months imprisonment — long enough for his son to complete most of his first year of school under the care of a kindly young woman teacher. (At one point, the chief of the bandit gang, in disguise, visits the school to make sure that the boy is getting along well.) Tonio, on receiving a letter from his son (which a guard has to read to him), comes to regret his own attitude. On his release at the end of his sentence, Tonio stops by the school for a friendly chat with the teacher, then arrives home where he sees his son practicing his penmanship. In the final scene, Tonio happily allows his son to teach him how to form letters.

== Cast ==
- Folco Lulli as Testa Di Rapa
- Gigliola Cinquetti as Angelina
- Umberto D'Orsi as Il Sindaco
- Carlo Croccolo as Brigante Salomone
- Franco Gulà as Il Pinzi
- Franco Parenti as Ispettore Scolastico
- Pippo Starnazza as Il Pretore
- Marco Tulli as Lucaccini
