= Thickhead =

Thickhead may refer to:

- Idiot
- Pachycephala, a genus of birds commonly known as whistlers
- Crassocephalum, a genus of plants

== See also ==
- Blockhead (disambiguation)
