= The Blockheads (video game) =

2013 video game

- Blockhead's default character
- Developer: Majic Jungle Software NoodleCake Studios
- Publisher: Majic Jungle Software NoodleCake Studios (for Android)
- Composer: Kevin MacLeod
- Platforms: iOS, Android (Defunct)
- Release: iOS: January 10, 2013; Android: September 24, 2013 (Defunct)
- Genres: Adventure, survival
- Modes: Single-player, multiplayer

The Blockheads is a survival sandbox indie mobile game created in 2013 by David Frampton, an indie developer and owner of Majic Jungle Software, a studio based in New Zealand.

== Gameplay ==
The Blockheads is a 2.5D survival sandbox game. The players control a customizable "Blockhead" avatar and can explore their surroundings, navigate through the world map, harvest materials to create structures, and craft more advanced tools and materials in the game.

Aggressive and passive creatures exist on land, underground, and in bodies of water. These include sharks, dodos, scorpions, drop bears, and fellow Blockheads. The game features a player versus player option that enables players to attack one another in multiplayer mode.

Multiplayer can be accessed over Wi-Fi, with worlds hosted over LAN, Game Center, or cloud servers, with the latter two only being available on iOS. Since version 1.7, servers are paid for with in-app purchases and the game center option was removed.

The game can also be hosted via an app for Mac users, although the availability of the world solely depends on the online status of the host. The player can 'warp' a Blockhead through a portal, randomly generating a finite world of multiple sizes ranging from 1/16-16x that loops back to the portal.

The Blockheads have five statistics: health, happiness, hunger, energy, and environment, accessible from the in-game menu. The hunger and energy bars will constantly decrease in most cases. The Blockhead must eat food to prevent the hunger bar from entirely depleting, otherwise the health bar will deplete due to starvation. When the energy bar is depleted, the Blockhead will walk slower and 'collapse from exhaustion'. The energy bar can be gradually filled by sleeping in a bed or on the ground, or it can be filled instantly by consuming caffeinated items like coffee.

The player must craft items to progress in the game. Crafting takes a certain amount of time, in or out of game, but this waiting process can be bypassed by using time crystals. Time crystals can be gained by watching short advertisements, mining them in caves, or through in-app purchases. Players can also purchase double-time, a feature speeding up crafting times by twice the speed and cuts the time crystal costs in half.

After version 1.7, players can create single player worlds or servers with custom options, such as custom health values, how the world is generated, custom sun colors, and even customizing the items Blockheads spawn with. Version 1.7 also included a new game mode called “expert mode.”

The Blockheads contains in-app purchases including the aforementioned double-time and time crystals, which can be used to craft items, make and/or support online servers, and do actions faster in the game. Players can also get time crystals through watching in-game advertisements. HD graphics used to be paid and added in hand drawn icons to the interface. With the 1.7 update, it was made free, but can be turned off in settings.

== Reception ==
Rickey Ainsworth of TouchArcade said that it is another one of many two-dimensional versions of Minecraft, the game they based it on, but their game features many twists and turns that make the game exciting. Metacritic, based on 7 reviews and 6 ratings, gives the game a 5/10 score.

== Other ==
The Blockheads has an official website and a forum run on Discourse and previously vBulletin. On March 10, 2022, it was announced that the forum would be permanently put into a read-only state, which occurred on April 11, 2022.

In January 2021, the app was removed from the Google Play Store without comment from its publisher, Noodlecake Studios. The Blockheads Community Manager would later confirm that the game was removed from the Google Play Store by Noodlecake Studios themselves due to failed negotiations with Google to circumvent certain requirements of modern Android versions.

On August 22, 2022, David Frampton announced that he would be shutting down the online services that hosted cloud servers due to "low player numbers" and a significant lack of maintenance. In his announcement, Frampton clarified that players would have the ability to download their cloud worlds and also mentioned that the shutdown would take some time. Along with claiming that he had no plans to remove The Blockheads from the App Store, Frampton also noted that Mac servers would not be affected by the shutdown.

== Sequel ==
On September 10th, 2026, Dave Frampton announced on the Blockheads website that Blockheads 2 was under development. It is being built in Frampton's free and open-source Katipo engine. The announcement stated that the initial release will be more akin to a remaster for compatibility with newer hardware and software, but that future releases may include new content. Frampton stated that Blockheads 2 will be available for iOS, Android, Linux, macOS, Windows, Steam, and itch.io.
