= Thicke =

Thicke is an Old English surname, and derives from a nickname thick, someone who was plump or fat. It may refer to:

- Alan Thicke (1947–2016), Canadian actor, songwriter, comedian, game and talk show host
- Robin Thicke (born 1977), American singer, songwriter and record producer
- Sir Hardin Thicke, fictional British presenter of the Master Tape Theatre radio show
- Todd Thicke, Canadian television writer and producer

== See also ==
- Thicke of the Night, American late night talk show
- Thick (disambiguation)
