= Giancarlo Zagni =

Italian director

- Born: 4 November 1926; Bologna, Kingdom of Italy
- Died: 21 March 2013 (aged 86)
- Education: University of Bologna
- Organizations: Director; screenwriter

Giancarlo Zagni (4 November 1926 – 21 March 2013) was an Italian director and screenwriter.

Born in Bologna, Zagni attended the Faculty of Medicine of the University of Bologna, then collaborated with L'avvenire d'Italia and other newspapers and magazines.

From 1951 to 1954 he was assistant director of Luchino Visconti in several stage works and in the film Senso; in the film set he knew the actress Alida Valli with whom he started a sixteen years long relationship. During this period he left Italy, first moving in New York, where he attended the Actors Studio, and then in Mexico, where he directed some stage plays and became the founder and a professor of the School of Autonomous Cinema National at the University of Mexico. Returned to Italy in 1961, Zagni made his directorial debut with the film La bellezza di Ippolita, an adaption of the novel with the same name written by Elio Bartolini, with which he represented Italy at the 12th Berlin International Film Festival. In 1966 he entered the Venice Film Festival with the comedy film Blockhead, which won the "Leone di San Marco Plate". With this film he made his retirement from filmmaking but not from cinema industry, with a new career as producer and distributor as a manager of the company Italnoleggio.
