= The Ellen DeGeneres Show season 19 =

The Ellen DeGeneres Show
- Season 19
- Starring: Ellen DeGeneres
- No. of episodes: 181 + 10 specials

Release
- Original release: September 13, 2021 – June 17, 2022

Season chronology
- ← Previous; Season 18

The nineteenth and final season of The Ellen DeGeneres Show (subtitled as Ellen: The Farewell Season) began airing on September 13, 2021 and concluded on June 3, 2022. After Ellen's departure on May 26, 2022, guest host and clip episodes were aired until June 17.

== Episodes ==
No. overall	No. in season	Original release date	Guests
3,116	1	September 13, 2021	Jimmy Kimmel
3,117	2	September 14, 2021	Jennifer Aniston
3,118	3	September 15, 2021	Tiffany Haddish, Charli D'Amelio & Dixie D'Amelio, Imagine Dragons
3,119	4	September 16, 2021	Kim Kardashian
3,120	5	September 17, 2021	Lori Greiner
3,121	6	September 20, 2021	Common, Julia Haart
3,122	7	September 21, 2021	Melissa Etheridge, Loni Love
3,123	8	September 22, 2021	Scott Foley, Dustin Tavella
3,124	9	September 23, 2021	Julianne Moore, Chloe Fineman
3,125	10	September 24, 2021	Matt James
Guest Host Arsenio Hall
3,126	11	September 27, 2021	Melissa McCarthy
3,127	12	September 28, 2021	Morgan Stickney
Guest Co-Hosts Mila Kunis & Leslie Jordan
3,128	13	September 29, 2021	Meghan Trainor, Josh Blue
3,129	14	September 30, 2021	Diddy, Nacho Figueras
3,130	15	October 1, 2021	Joel McHale, Curtis Stone
Guest Host Arsenio Hall
3,131	16	October 4, 2021	Anderson Cooper, Aidan Bryant
3,132	17	October 5, 2021	Leah Remini, Dr. Michael Beckwith
3,133	18	October 6, 2021	Brandi Carlile, Captain Sandy
3,134	19	October 7, 2021	Jason Sudeikis, Kane Brown
3,135	20	October 8, 2021	Adam Lambert
Guest Host tWitch
3,136	21	October 11, 2021	Jay Shetty, Cheryl Hines
3,137	22	October 12, 2021	Howie Mandel
3,138	23	October 13, 2021	Ludacris, Alessia Cara
3,139	24	October 14, 2021	Chandra Wilson, Mike Mizanin
Guest Host Mario Lopez
3,140	25	October 15, 2021	Marlee Matlin
Guest Host Mario Lopez
3,141	26	October 18, 2021	David Duchovny, Liza Koshy, Peter Rosalita
3,142	27	October 19, 2021	Jason Momoa, D-Nice, Hunter Woodhall & Tara Davis
3,143	28	October 20, 2021	Gwyneth Paltrow
3,144	29	October 21, 2021	Khloé Kardashian, Arlo Parks
3,145	30	October 22, 2021	Amanda Seyfried, Kenya Moore
Guest Host Tiffany Haddish
3,146	31	October 25, 2021	Luke Bryan, Michael J. Woodard
Guest Host Katy Perry
3,147	32	October 26, 2021	Anya Taylor-Joy
3,148	33	October 27, 2021	Lester Holt, Michael Thomas, Brandi Carlile
3,149	34	October 28, 2021	Eva Longoria, Deepak Chopra
3,150	35	October 29, 2021	Kris Jenner, Kim Kardashian, Shin Lim
Ellen’s Huge Halloween Show
3,151	36	November 1, 2021	Jane Lynch, Amber Ruffin, Tamara Walcott
3,152	37	November 2, 2021	Kumail Nanjiani, Anderson East
3,153	38	November 3, 2021	Tracy Morgan, Daniel Ricciardo
3,154	39	November 4, 2021	Jojo Siwa, Mickey Guyton, Dr. Tara Stoinski
3,155	40	November 5, 2021	Nicole Scherzinger, Blake Anderson
Guest Host Tiffany Haddish
3,156	41	November 8, 2021	Salma Hayek, Måneskin
3,157	42	November 9, 2021	Sarah Paulson
3,158	43	November 10, 2021	Jamie Foxx
3,159	44	November 11, 2021	Kathryn Hahn, Candace Parker
3,160	45	November 12, 2021	Olivia Munn, Ester Dean
Guest Host tWitch
3,161	46	November 15, 2021	Kristen Bell & Dax Shepard, Courtney Barnett
3,162	47	November 16, 2021	Kieran Culkin, Brandon Maxwell, Tig Notaro, Wale
3,163	48	November 17, 2021	Sarah Snook, Glennon Doyle
3,164	49	November 18, 2021	Meghan, Duchess of Sussex
3,165	50	November 19, 2021	Hailey Bieber, Gina Yashere
Guest Host Yvonne Orji
3,166	51	November 22, 2021	Dennis Quaid, Kaitlyn Dever
Day 1 of 12 Days of Giveaways!
3,167	52	November 23, 2021	Casey Wilson, Kalen Allen
Day 2 of 12 Days of Giveaways!
3,168	53	November 24, 2021	Jared Leto
Day 3 of 12 Days of Giveaways!
3,169	54	November 29, 2021	Ben Platt
Day 4 of 12 Days of Giveaways!
3,170	55	November 30, 2021	Peter Sarsgaard, Avril Lavigne
Day 5 of 12 Days of Giveaways!
3,171	56	December 1, 2021	Wanda Sykes
Day 6 of 12 Days of Giveaways!
3,172	57	December 2, 2021	Michael Keaton
Day 7 of 12 Days of Giveaways!
3,173	58	December 3, 2021	Octavia Spencer, Maya Erskine & Anna Konkle, Blake Vogt
Day 8 of 12 Days of Giveaways!
3,174	59	December 6, 2021	Blake Shelton
Day 9 of 12 Days of Giveaways!
3,175	60	December 7, 2021	Chrissy Teigen
Day 10 of 12 Days of Giveaways!
3,176	61	December 8, 2021	Rosario Dawson, Ed Sheeran
Day 11 of 12 Days of Giveaways!
3,177	62	December 9, 2021	Nicholas Braun, Brené Brown
Day 12 of 12 Days of Giveaways!
3,178	63	December 10, 2021	Zachary Levi, O'Shea Jackson Jr.
Guest Host tWitch
3,179	64	December 13, 2021	Ken Jeong, Alison Sweeney, Brett Dennen
3,180	65	December 14, 2021	Scarlett Johansson & Bono, Joshua Vacanti
3,181	66	December 15, 2021	Aubrey Plaza
3,182	67	December 16, 2021	Reese Witherspoon & Matthew McConaughey, Ed Sheeran
3,183	68	December 17, 2021	Michael Bublé, Pentatonix
Guest Host Howie Mandel
3,184	69	December 20, 2021	Melanie C, Preacher Lawson
Guest Host Howie Mandel
3,185	70	December 21, 2021	Cheyenne Jackson, Max Greenfield, Amanda Shires
Guest Host Leslie Jordan
3,186	71	December 22, 2021	Meghan Trainor
Guest Host JoJo Siwa
3,187	72	December 23, 2021	Neil Patrick Harris
Guest Host tWitch
3,188	73	December 24, 2021	Jennifer Aniston
3,189	74	December 27, 2021	Iman Shumpert
Guest Host JoJo Siwa
3,190	75	December 28, 2021	J. B. Smoove, EJ Williams
Guest Host tWitch
3,191	76	December 29, 2021	Cary Elwes, Tori Kelly
Guest Host Brad Paisley
3,192	77	December 30, 2021	Normani
Guest Host Ciara
3,193	78	January 3, 2022	RuPaul, José Andrés, Jim & Sasha Allen
3,194	79	January 4, 2022	Lily Collins, Steve Spangler, The War On Drugs
3,195	80	January 5, 2022	Jessica Chastain, Girl Named Tom
3,196	81	January 6, 2022	Penélope Cruz
3,197	82	January 7, 2022	Nicole Byer
Guest Host tWitch
3,198	83	January 10, 2022	Jay Leno, Black Pumas
3,199	84	January 11, 2022	John Cena, Parquet Courts
3,200	85	January 12, 2022	Beth Behrs, Oz Pearlman
3,201	86	January 13, 2022	Christina Ricci, Ainslie MacLeod
3,202	87	January 14, 2022	Julie Bowen, Anders Holm
Guest Host Adam Devine
3,203	88	January 17, 2022	Heidi Klum, Brandon Leake
3,204	89	January 18, 2022	Steve Harvey, Harry Mack, Charlotte Day Wilson
3,205	90	January 19, 2022	Monica Aldama, Erin Blaire
3,206	91	January 20, 2022	Mahershala Ali, Martha Stewart, Colby Stevenson
3,207	92	January 21, 2022	Julianne Hough, Nina Dobrev
Guest Host Adam Devine
3,208	93	January 24, 2022	Andrew Garfield, Sherri Shepherd
3,209	94	January 25, 2022	Ciara, Tabitha Brown
3,210	95	January 26, 2022	Courteney Cox, Chris Martin and Coldplay
Ellen’s Birthday Show
3,211	96	January 27, 2022	Paris Hilton, Vontae Johnson, Lizzy McAlpine
3,212	97	January 28, 2022	Jamie Dornan, Japanese Breakfast
3,213	98	January 31, 2022	Kristen Bell
3,214	99	February 1, 2022	Murray Bartlett
3,215	100	February 2, 2022	David Spade, Chris Martin, Flamingo Estate Owner Richard Christiansen
3,216	101	February 3, 2022	Halle Berry, Sylvan Esso
3,217	102	February 4, 2022	Sarah Hyland, Julianna Peña
Guest Host Mario Lopez
3,218	103	February 7, 2022	Chelsea Handler, Scott Eastwood
3,219	104	February 8, 2022	Josh Gad, Benson Boone, Colin Cloud
3,220	105	February 9, 2022	Jennifer Lopez
3,221	106	February 10, 2022	Kevin Hart
3,222	107	February 11, 2022	Owen Wilson, Teddy Swims
3,223	108	February 14, 2022	Kat Dennings, Hannah Waddingham, Kym Douglas
3,224	109	February 15, 2022	Maluma, Pamela Adlon
3,225	110	February 16, 2022	Laverne Cox, Ezra Frech
3,226	111	February 17, 2022	Mark Wahlberg, Principal Akbar Cook
3,227	112	February 18, 2022	Nicole Ari Parker
Guest Host tWitch
3,228	113	February 21, 2022	Usher
3,229	114	February 22, 2022	Eric Stonestreet, Positive Impact Movement
3,230	115	February 23, 2022	Tyler Perry, Glennon Doyle, Phillip-Michael Scales
3,231	116	February 24, 2022	Andrew Whitworth, Marlee Matlin, Sylvan Esso
3,232	117	February 25, 2022	Greg Kinnear, Cheryl Porter
Guest Host Mario Lopez
3,233	118	February 28, 2022	Usher
3,234	119	March 1, 2022	Milo Ventimiglia
3,235	120	March 2, 2022	Kevin Nealon, Jacob Elordi
3,236	121	March 3, 2022	Jimmie Allen, Priscilla Block
Guest Host Mickey Guyton
3,237	122	March 4, 2022	Russell Wilson, La La Anthony
Guest Host Ciara
3,238	123	March 7, 2022	Machine Gun Kelly, Mamoudou Athie
3,239	124	March 8, 2022	Zach Braff
3,240	125	March 9, 2022	Jennifer Garner, Javier Bardem
3,241	126	March 10, 2022	Oliver Hudson, Lana Condor
Guest Host tWitch
3,242	127	March 11, 2022	Terry Crews, Pauline Chalamet
Guest Host Julie Bowen
3,243	128	March 18, 2022	John Cho, Tyler James Williams
Guest Host tWitch
3,244	129	March 21, 2022	Angela Bassett, Dina Shihabi, Alison Sweeney
3,245	130	March 22, 2022	Ted Danson, Kiesza
3,246	131	March 23, 2022	Mario López
3,247	132	March 24, 2022	Channing Tatum
3,248	133	March 25, 2022	Samuel L. Jackson, Chloe Kim
Guest Host Leslie Jones
3,249	134	March 28, 2022	David Letterman, Léa Kyle, Slavik "Vik" Vyacheslav Pustovoytov
3,250	135	March 29, 2022	Lisa Kudrow, Ronda Rousey, Blue Man Group, Dezi Saenz
3,251	136	March 30, 2022	Laura Dern, Ryan Seacrest, Walker Scobell
3,252	137	March 31, 2022	Brené Brown, Sydney Sweeney
3,253	138	April 1, 2022	Allison Russell
Guest Host Brandi Carlile
3,254	139	April 4, 2022	Sarah Silverman, Jon Dorenbos
3,255	140	April 5, 2022	Kris Jenner, Jake Wesley Rogers
3,256	141	April 6, 2022	Gwen Stefani, Bella Heathcote
3,257	142	April 7, 2022	Wanda Sykes, Alicia Keys, Blake Vogt
3,258	143	April 8, 2022	Lena Waithe, Jacob Latimore
Guest Host Kandi Burruss
3,259	144	April 11, 2022	Tracee Ellis Ross, Margaret Qualley, Brian Chesky
3,260	145	April 12, 2022	Mark Wahlberg, Lucius
3,261	146	April 13, 2022	Kim Kardashian, Charlie Puth
3,262	147	April 14, 2022	Joe Manganiello, Simone Ashley
Guest Co-Hosts Tiffany Haddish and tWitch
3,263	148	April 15, 2022	Chrissy Metz, Christina Perri
Guest Host Mario Lopez
3,264	149	April 18, 2022	Anthony Anderson, Kaitlyn Dever, Muna
3,265	150	April 19, 2022	Michelle Obama
3,266	151	April 20, 2022	Amy Schumer, Tig Nataro
3,267	152	April 21, 2022	Katie Lowes, Tyler Cameron, Simon Pierro
Guest Host Mario Lopez
3,268	153	April 22, 2022	Jenna Dewan, Jordan Davis
Guest Host tWitch
3,269	154	April 25, 2022	Robin Roberts, Dwyane Wade
3,270	155	April 26, 2022	Adam Levine, Bethenny Frankel
3,271	156	April 27, 2022	Rob Lowe, Portugal. The Man, Ellen & Staff in Las Vegas
3,272	157	April 28, 2022	Lily Tomlin, Charlize Glass
3,273	158	April 29, 2022	Sterling K. Brown, Nick & Vanessa Lachey
Guest Host tWitch
3,274	159	May 2, 2022	Serena Williams, Jay Shetty, Indigo Girls
3,275	160	May 3, 2022	Portia de Rossi, Dove Cameron
3,276	161	May 4, 2022	Jessica Alba, Alec Benjamin
3,277	162	May 5, 2022	Jessica Biel, Behati Prinsloo
3,278	163	May 6, 2022	Cynthia Erivo
Guest Host Tiffany Haddish
3,279	164	May 9, 2022	Diane Keaton
3,280	165	May 10, 2022	Ellie Kemper, Steve Spangler
3,281	166	May 11, 2022	Zac Efron, Bonnie Raitt, Ryan Tedder
3,282	167	May 12, 2022	Rebel Wilson, John Paul DeJoria, Sophia Grace & Rosie
3,283	168	May 13, 2022	Seth Meyers, Jerrod Carmichael, Kym Douglas
3,284	169	May 16, 2022	Kate McKinnon
3,285	170	May 17, 2022	Justin Timberlake, Keith Urban
3,286	171	May 18, 2022	Sean "Diddy" Combs, Luke Bryan, John Legend & Chrissy Teigen
3,287	172	May 19, 2022	Kerry Washington, Brad Paisley
3,288	173	May 20, 2022	Julia Louis-Dreyfus, Drew Brees
3,289	174	May 23, 2022	J Balvin, Howie Mandel, Jennifer Lawrence
3,290	175	May 24, 2022	Oprah Winfrey, Mila Kunis
3,291	176	May 25, 2022	Bruno Mars
3,292	177	May 26, 2022	Jennifer Aniston, Billie Eilish, Pink
Ellen has her final episode with her final guests. At the end of the finale, she ends it the way the show first began by watching herself on TV.
3,293	178	May 31, 2022	Nika King, Simu Liu
Guest Host Leslie Jones
3,294	179	June 1, 2022	Natasha Leggero, Cheryl Hines
Guest Host Tig Notaro
3,295	180	June 2, 2022	Lilly Singh, Quinta Brunson
Guest Host Dwyane Wade
3,296	181	June 3, 2022	Cat Deeley, Emmanuel Acho
Guest Co-Hosts Dwyane Wade and tWitch
Special	Special	June 6, 2022 (Ellen's Favorite Moments)	Melissa McCarthy, Hannah Waddingham, Julia Haart
Special	Special	June 7, 2022 (Ellen's Best Moments)	Kim Kardashian, Loni Love
Special	Special	June 8, 2022 (Ellen's Fun Moments)	Jennifer Aniston, Jimmy Kimmel, Common, Cheryl Hines, Charli & Dixie D’Amelio
Special	Special	June 9, 2022 (Ellen's Exciting Moments)	Brandi Carlile, Ludacris
Special	Special	June 10, 2022 (Ellen's Fun Moments)	Tyler Perry, Usher
Special	Special	June 13, 2022 (Ellen's Favorite Moments)	Kristen Bell, Dax Shepard
Special	Special	June 14, 2022 (Ellen's Best Moments)	Scarlett Johansson, Bono, Mickey Guyton, Oz Pearlman
Special	Special	June 15, 2022 (Ellen's Fun Moments)	David Spade, Machine Gun Kelly, Kym Douglas
Special	Special	June 16, 2022 (Ellen's Exciting Moments)	Laura Dern, Meghan, Duchess of Sussex, Erin Blaire, Michelle Li
Special	Special	June 17, 2022 (Ellen's Fun Moments)	Heidi Klum, Michelle Obama, Shin Lim, Coach Cal
