= The Ellen DeGeneres Show season 13 =

The Ellen DeGeneres Show
- Season 13
- Starring: Ellen DeGeneres
- No. of episodes: 177

Release
- Original release: September 8, 2015 – June 17, 2016

Season chronology
- ← Previous; Season 12 Next → Season 14

This is a list of episodes of the thirteenth season of The Ellen DeGeneres Show, which aired from September 2015 to June 2016.

== Episodes ==
No. overall	No. in season	Original release date	Guests
2,031	1	September 8, 2015	Caitlyn Jenner, Team Umizoomi, Blaze and the Monster Machines, Dr Oz
2,032	2	September 9, 2015	Malala Yousafzai, Ice Cube, O'Shea Jackson, Jr.
2,033	3	September 10, 2015	Hillary Clinton, Pink, (New York City Show)
2,034	4	September 11, 2015	Jimmy Fallon, Pink (New York City Show)
2,035	5	September 14, 2015	Emily Blunt, Ronda Rousey
2,036	6	September 15, 2015	Justin Bieber Adele
2,037	7	September 16, 2015	Jesse Tyler Ferguson, Ed Oxenbould
2,038	8	September 17, 2015	Scott Foley, Tig Notaro, Torrae Owen
2,039	9	September 18, 2015	Dakota Johnson, Leona Lewis
2,040	10	September 21, 2015	Ricky Gervais, Chris Cornell
2,041	11	September 22, 2015	Taraji P. Henson, Lea Michele, James Taylor
2,042	12	September 23, 2015	Portia de Rossi, Courtney 'Dytto' Kelly, Duran Duran and Janelle Monae
2,043	13	September 24, 2015	Viola Davis, Zachary Levi
2,044	14	September 25, 2015	Wanda Sykes, David Arquette
2,045	15	September 28, 2015	Claire Danes, Allison Holker and Andy Grammer
2,046	16	September 29, 2015	Matt Damon, Natasha Lyonne
2,047	17	September 30, 2015	Kim Kardashian West, Tracee Ellis Ross, Jake Owen
2,048	18	October 1, 2015	Jason Segel, Don Henley
2,049	19	October 2, 2015	The Lovable, Lena Dunham
2,050	20	October 5, 2015	Nathan Lane, Trai Byers, Rita Ora
2,051	21	October 6, 2015	Cate Blanchett, Max Greenfield
2,052	22	October 7, 2015	Julianne Moore, Usain Bolt, Thomas Rhett
2,053	23	October 8, 2015	Chelsea Clinton, Matt Bomer, The Band Perry
2,054	24	October 9, 2015	Selena Gomez, Taye Diggs
2,055	25	October 12, 2015	Kate Winslet, Pharrell Williams
2,056	26	October 13, 2015	Steve Carell, Sienna Miller, Rob Thomas
2,057	27	October 14, 2015	Justin Theroux, Meghan Trainor
2,058	28	October 15, 2015	Sen. Bernie Sanders, Shaping Sound Dance Company
2,059	29	October 16, 2015	Elliot Page, Brett Eldredge
2,060	30	October 19, 2015	Bradley Cooper, Melissa Benoist, Gary Clark Jr.
2,061	31	October 20, 2015	James Corden, Florence and the Machine
2,062	32	October 21, 2015	Sarah Silverman, Morris Chestnut, Of Monsters and Men, Taylor Swift
2,063	33	October 22, 2015	Mark Wahlberg, Nick Jonas
2,064	34	October 23, 2015	Oprah Winfrey, 5 Seconds of Summer
2,065	35	October 26, 2015	Anthony Anderson, Gwen Stefani, Bindi Irwin & Derek Hough
2,066	36	October 27, 2015	Carrie Underwood, Will Forte
2,067	37	October 28, 2015	Heidi Klum, Trevor Noah
2,068	38	October 29, 2015	Sandra Bullock, Billy Bob Thornton, Anthony Mackie
2,069	39	October 30, 2015	Josh Duhamel, Ariana Grande(halloween show)
2,070	40	November 2, 2015	David Spade, Giada De Laurentiis, Brett Eldredge
2,071	41	November 3, 2015	Rebel Wilson
2,072	42	November 4, 2015	Michael Keaton, Little Mix
2,073	43	November 5, 2015	Will Smith, Greyson Chance
2,074	44	November 6, 2015	Drew Barrymore, Sam Smith, Martha Stewart
2,075	45	November 9, 2015	Justin Bieber, Shonda Rhimes
2,076	46	November 10, 2015	Rob Lowe, Justin Bieber, Kellie Pickler, Ed Sheeran, Jamie Lawson
2,077	47	November 11, 2015	Seth Rogen, Justin Bieber, Leon Bridges
2,078	48	November 12, 2015 (Ellen's 2,000th Show)	Kerry Washington, Justin Bieber, surprise appearances by Jennifer Aniston and Justin Timberlake
2,079	49	November 13, 2015	Diane Keaton, Justin Bieber
2,080	50	November 16, 2015	Khloe Kardashian, Justin Bieber
2,081	51	November 17, 2015	Eric Stonestreet, Harmony Zhu
2,082	52	November 18, 2015	One Direction
2,083	53	November 19, 2015	Bryan Cranston
2,084	54	November 20, 2015	Gwen Stefani, Steve Spangler,
2,085	55	November 23, 2015	Day 1 of 12 Days, Sylvester Stallone
2,086	56	November 24, 2015	Day 2 of 12 Days, Elizabeth Banks, Ellie Goulding
2,087	57	November 25, 2015	Day 3 of 12 Days, Jamie Foxx, Michael B. Jordan
2,088	58	November 30, 2015	Day 4 of 12 Days, Kylie Jenner, Ed Sheeran & Rudimental
2,089	59	December 1, 2015	Day 5 of 12 Days, Wanda Sykes, Kunal Nayyar, Sia
2,090	60	December 2, 2015	Day 6 of 12 Days, Anna Faris, Darby Stanchfield
2,091	61	December 3, 2015	Day 7 of 12 Days, Sofia Vergara
2,092	62	December 4, 2015	Day 8 of 12 Days, Usher, Coldplay
2,093	63	December 7, 2015	Day 9 of 12 Days, Harrison Ford
2,094	64	December 8, 2015	Day 10 of 12 Days, Samuel L. Jackson, Joshua Jackson, Chris Young
2,095	65	December 9, 2015	Day 11 of 12 Days, Nick Cannon, 'Dancing with the Stars Live'!
2,096	66	December 10, 2015	Day 12 of 12 Days, Kat Dennings,
2,097	67	December 11, 2015	Bonus 12 Days Andy Samberg, America Ferrera
2,098	68	December 14, 2015	Bonus 12 Days Idina Menzel
2,099	69	December 15, 2015	Bonus 12 Days Lupita Nyong'o
2,100	70	December 16, 2015	Bonus 12 Days Tina Fey
2,101	71	December 17, 2015	Bonus 12 Days Daisy Ridley, Oscar Isaac, John Boyega, Dax Shepard
2,102	72	December 18, 2015	Bonus 12 Days Beth Behrs
2,103	73	December 21, 2015	Bonus 12 Days Steve Carell, Justin Bieber,
2,104	74	January 5, 2016	Jennifer Lopez
2,105	75	January 6, 2016	Ricky Gervais, Saoirse Ronan
2,106	76	January 7, 2016	Queen Latifah, Marlon Wayans
2,107	77	January 8, 2016	Leonardo DiCaprio, Eva Longoria
2,108	78	January 11, 2016	Hillary Clinton
2,109	79	January 12, 2016	Kevin Hart, Kygo featuring Parson James
2,110	80	January 13, 2016	Allison Janney, Charlie Puth
2,111	81	January 14, 2016	LL Cool J, Aubrey Plaza
2,112	82	January 15, 2016	John Krasinski, Ken Jeong, Bob Harper
2,113	83	January 18, 2016	Elton John
2,114	84	January 19, 2016	Sean Hayes, Dierks Bentley, Keke Palmer
2,115	85	January 20, 2016	Zac Efron, Lauren Cohan
2,116	86	January 21, 2016	Chelsea Handler, Gina Rodriguez
2,117	87	January 25, 2016	Kourtney Kardashian, MUTEMATH
2,118	88	January 26, 2016	Mario Lopez, 'Bachelor' Ben Higgins
2,119	89	January 27, 2016	Jack Black, Olivia Munn, Bob Moses
2,120	90	January 28, 2016	Channing Tatum, Troye Sivan
2,121	91	January 29, 2016	Hilary Duff, Dereck & Beverly Joubert
2,122	92	February 1, 2016	Hugh Jackman, Taron Egerton
2,123	93	February 2, 2016	Judge Judy Sheindlin, Jacob Tremblay, Sia,
2,124	94	February 3, 2016	Jason Sudeikis, Tim Tebow
2,125	95	February 4, 2016	George Clooney, Rihanna
2,126	96	February 5, 2016	Heidi Klum, Panic! at the Disco
2,127	97	February 8, 2016	Julie Bowen, Elton John
2,128	98	February 9, 2016	Megan Fox, Cast of 'Fuller House'
2,129	99	February 10, 2016	Ryan Seacrest, Demi Lovato
2,130	100	February 11, 2016	Scott Foley, Elle King
2,131	101	February 12, 2016	President Barack Obama, DNCE
2,132	102	February 15, 2016	Kate Hudson, Demi Lovato, Fall Out Boy
2,133	103	February 16, 2016	Ronda Rousey, Jenna Dewan Tatum, Shawn Mendes & Camila Cabello
2,134	104	February 17, 2016	Ryan Reynolds
2,135	105	February 18, 2016	Adele
2,136	106	February 19, 2016	Rebel Wilson, Maksim & Valentin Chmerkovskiy
2,137	107	February 22, 2016	David Duchovny, Brielle
2,138	108	February 23, 2016	Kaley Cuoco, Miguel and Travis Scott
2,139	109	February 24, 2016	Kate McKinnon
2,140	110	February 25, 2016	Gwen Stefani, Ashley Graham
2,141	111	February 26, 2016	Ray Romano, Carly Rae Jepsen
2,142	112	February 29, 2016	Robin Roberts
2,143	113	March 1, 2016	Kris Jenner
2,144	114	March 2, 2016	Ashton Kutcher, Charles Kelley
2,145	115	March 3, 2016	Zooey Deschanel, Kelly Clarkson, Bonnie Raitt
2,146	116	March 7, 2016	Sally Field, Max Greenfield, Simone Biles, Pete Yorn
2,147	117	March 8, 2016	Seth Meyers, Sarah Paulson, American Authors
2,148	118	March 9, 2016	Felicity Huffman, Wendi McLendon-Covey
2,149	119	March 10, 2016	Olivia Wilde, Aaron Gordon
2,150	120	March 14, 2016	Kirsten Dunst, Melissa Rauch
2,151	121	March 15, 2016	Steve Harvey, Gal Gadot, Rita Wilson
2,152	122	March 16, 2016	Ben Affleck, Padma Lakshmi, Andrew Bird
2,153	123	March 17, 2016	Beth Behrs, Marcia Clark
2,154	124	March 21, 2016	Ariel Winter, Santigold
2,155	125	March 22, 2016	Harrison Ford, Anthony Anderson, Novak Djokovic, Artyon Celestine
2,156	126	March 23, 2016	Aaron Paul, Zendaya, Zara Larsson & MNEK
2,157	127	March 24, 2016	Jessica Biel, Mireille Enos, Andra Day
2,158	128	April 4, 2016	Kristen Bell, Lukas Graham
2,159	129	April 5, 2016	John Travolta, Rob Delaney & Sharon Horgan
2,160	130	April 6, 2016	Ice Cube, John Cena, Mike Posner
2,161	131	April 7, 2016	Nicki Minaj, Brandy Clark
2,162	132	April 8, 2016	Melissa McCarthy, Bob Odenkirk, Iggy Azalea
2,163	133	April 11, 2016	Elizabeth Banks, Nyle DiMarco & Peta Murgatroyd
2,164	134	April 12, 2016	Eric Stonestreet, Jerrod Carmichael, Fitz and the Tantrums
2,165	135	April 13, 2016	Sylvester Stallone, Gabrielle Reece, Abbi Jacobson & Ilana Glazer
2,166	136	April 14, 2016	Emilia Clarke, Shaquille O'Neal
2,167	137	April 18, 2016	Chris Hemsworth, Jurnee Smollett-Bell, Empire of the Sun
2,168	138	April 19, 2016	David Spade, Savages
2,169	139	April 20, 2016	Jessica Chastain, Meghan Trainor
2,170	140	April 21, 2016	Ellie Kemper, Alessia Cara
2,171	141	April 25, 2016	Ellen Pompeo, Jodie Sweetin & Keo Motsepe
2,172	142	April 26, 2016	Tracee Ellis Ross
2,173	143	April 27, 2016	Kobe Bryant, will.i.am
2,174	144	April 28, 2016	Julia Roberts, Brielle
2,175	145	April 29, 2016	Mario Lopez
2,176	146	May 2, 2016	Chris Evans & Elizabeth Olsen, Macey Hensley
2,177	147	May 3, 2016	Jane Fonda
2,178	148	May 4, 2016	P!nk, Kai Langer
2,179	149	May 5, 2016	Cameron Diaz
2,180	150	May 6, 2016	Mila Kunis & Kristen Bell
2,181	151	May 9, 2016	Nick Jonas
2,182	152	May 10, 2016	Russell Crowe, Fifth Harmony
2,183	153	May 11, 2016	Wanda Sykes, Journey
2,184	154	May 12, 2016	Alec Baldwin, Keith Urban
2,185	155	May 13, 2016	Ryan Gosling
2,186	156	May 16, 2016	Christina Aguilera, Bryce Dallas Howard, Kym Douglas
2,187	157	May 17, 2016	Colin Farrell, Macklemore & Ryan Lewis, Bill Hader
2,188	158	May 18, 2016	Drake
2,189	159	May 19, 2016	Kanye West, Taraji P. Henson
2,190	160	May 20, 2016	Johnny Depp
2,191	161	May 23, 2016	Blake Shelton, Drew Carey
2,192	162	May 24, 2016	Anne Hathaway, Steven Tyler
2,193	163	May 25, 2016	The Cast of Ghostbusters, Hillary Clinton
2,194	164	May 26, 2016	Jesse Tyler Ferguson, Kevin Nealon
2,195	165	May 31, 2016	T.J. Miller
2,196	166	June 1, 2016	Ellen's Favorite Moments with Macey Hensley
2,197	167	June 2, 2016	The Best of ellentube with Tyler Oakley
2,198	168	June 6, 2016	Ellen's favorite staff moments, with Mario Lopez
2,199	169	June 7, 2016	Ellen's favorite human interest stories, with Ellie Kemper
2,200	170	June 8, 2016	The best of the Kardashians, with Khloe Kardashian
2,201	171	June 9, 2016	Ellen's favorite moments with athletes, with Drew Brees
2,202	172	June 10, 2016	Ellen's favorite moments of Season 13
2,203	173	June 13, 2016	Ed O'Neill, Wendy Williams, Ibtihaj Muhammad
2,204	174	June 14, 2016	Liev Schreiber, Eugene Levy
2,205	175	June 15, 2016	Howie Mandel, Tayt Andersen
2,206	176	June 16, 2016	Ty Burrell, Alison Sweeney
2,207	177	June 17, 2016	Diane Keaton, Tig Notaro, Dan + Shay
