= The Ellen DeGeneres Show season 12 =

The Ellen DeGeneres Show
- Season 12
- Starring: Ellen DeGeneres
- No. of episodes: 170 + 4 specials

Release
- Original release: September 8, 2014 – June 12, 2015

Season chronology
- ← Previous; Season 11 Next → Season 13

This is a list of episodes of the twelfth season of The Ellen DeGeneres Show, which aired from September 2014 to June 2015.

== Episodes ==
No. overall	No. in season	Original release date	Guests	U.S. viewers (millions)
1,861	1	September 8, 2014	Adam Levine, Blake Shelton, Gwen Stefani, Pharrell Williams, Maroon 5,	3.85
"Battle Rounds in the Round" with Ellen, Adam, Blake, Gwen and Pharrell; Maroon 5 perform "Maps"; Ellen takes on the ALS Ice Bucket Challenge with Anthony Carbajal
1,862	2	September 9, 2014	Kim Kardashian West, Iggy Azalea, Rita Ora,	3.85
Ellen's "Anaconda" video; 6-year old CEO; Iggy Azalea and Rita Ora perform "Black Widow"; Kim Kardashian accepts the ALS Ice Bucket Challenge
1,863	3	September 10, 2014	Channing Tatum, Nicki Minaj	3.85
"Naked Dateline Saturday Night Mystery"; Nicki & Ellen play "Butt Wait, There's More"; "A Heartwarming Surprise for an Inspiring Music Teacher" New York music teacher Melissa Salguero
1,864	4	September 11, 2014	David Spade, Meghan Trainor	3.85
American Ninja Warrior Parking Lot Challenge Part 1 with Kacy Catanzaro and Bob Harper (Hosted By Ellen, Matt Iseman and Akbar Gbaja-Biamila); Throwback Thursday to September 7, 2005; 5-year-old Viral Video Star Noah Ritter; Walking with Dinosaurs: The Arena Spectacular Dinosaur; Meghan Trainor performed "All About That Bass"; Ellen pays tribute to Robin Williams
1,865	5	September 12, 2014	Harry Connick Jr., Mireille Enos	3.85
6-year old "Exasperating" video star (Military Family Reunion); American Ninja Warrior Parking Lot Challenge Part 2 with Allison Janney and Anna Faris (Hosted By Ellen, Matt Iseman and Akbar Gbaja-Biamila)
1,866	6	September 15, 2014	Kristen Wiig, Timothy Olyphant, Nico & Vinz, tWitch(guest DJ)	3.42
Who's In My Bushes? (appearance by Usher); American Ninja Warrior Parking Lot Challenge Part 3 with Usher (Hosted By Ellen, Matt Iseman and Akbar Gbaja-Biamila); Kristen Wiig and Ellen sing "Let It Go"; Nico & Vinz performed "Am I Wrong"
1,867	7	September 16, 2014	Zooey Deschanel, Loni Love, Tamar Braxton, Jeannie Mai, Adrienne Bailon, Tamera Mowry(guest DJs)	3.42
KTLA 5's Sam Rubin; Naked Audience Dancing; Ellen takes on the American Ninja Warrior Course (Hosted By Matt Iseman and Akbar Gbaja-Biamila); Ikea Furniture, Game of Thrones Character or Swedish Curse Word (Kevin from Ikea Customer Service); Getting Real With The Real hosts; Ellen plays Epic or Fail with Zooey Deschanel; LSU Student wins Dr. Pepper Tuition
1,868	8	September 17, 2014	Ty Burrell, Hank Azaria, Bastille, Chris Bosh(guest DJs)	3.42
This Minus That; Hoop Dee Do Me with Ellen, Ty Burrell and Chris Bosh; Bastille performed "Flaws"; Hidden Camera earpiece prank at Dunkin' Donuts
1,869	9	September 18, 2014	Jason Segel, Joel Madden & Benji Madden(guest DJs)	3.42
Throwback Thursday to September 9, 2008; Ellen scares Jason Segel; Kevin Hart & Josh Gad Dance-Off; The Wedding Ringer preview; The Madden Brothers performed "We Are Done"
1,870	10	September 19, 2014	Kaley Cuoco, Dax Shepard, Shawn Mendes	3.42
Ellen Introduces Kids to the Technology of Yesterday; Classic Joke Friday; Shawn Mendes performed "Life of the Party"; Ellen played "Heads Up" with Dax Shepard
1,871	11	September 22, 2014	Lauren Graham, Benjamin McKenzie	3.32
Ellen's Idea Box; So You Think You Can Dance Top 6 (Ricky, Valerie, Jessica, Zack, Casey, and Jacque) perform; 3-year-old golfer Tommy; a college student plays "Cash at Your Dorm"
1,872	12	September 23, 2014	Jesse Tyler Ferguson, Wendi McLendon-Covey, Jared Leto, Thirty Seconds to Mars	3.32
Ellen consumer reports and stuff; Ellen arranges an audtition for Nick, the Gardener in Magic Mike 2; Jesse Tyler Ferguson does an audition for Dancing With the Stars; Thirty Seconds to Mars performed "Do or Die"
1,873	13	September 24, 2014	Eric Stonestreet, André Benjamin, Kiesza	3.32
8-year-old cellist; Ellen scares Eric Stonestreet; Kiesza performed "Hideaway"; On the set of "Pitch Perfect 2"
1,874	14	September 25, 2014	Kerry Washington, Tony Goldwyn, Scott Foley, Guillermo Diaz, Darby Stanchfield, Joshua Malina, Katie Lowes, Jeff Perry, Bellamy Young	3.32
Ellen's Scene from "Scandal"; Anthony Carbajal Goes to iHeartRadio Music Festival; The "Scandal" Cast Reveals Their Secrets (appearance by Portia de Rossi)
1,875	15	September 26, 2014	Anna Faris, Kenny Chesney, Janel Parrish(guest DJ)	3.32
Classic Joke Friday; Three Inspiring Homecoming Queens; Anna and Ellen prank call Chris Pratt; Tic-Tac and Go; Kenny Chesney performed "American Kids"
1,876	16	September 29, 2014	Martin Short, Temples, Melanie Iglesias(guest DJ)	3.56
Audience Facebook pictures; This Plus That; Ellen played "Heads Up" with Martin Short; Temples performed "Shelter Song"; Noah Ritter returns
1,877	17	September 30, 2014	Dylan McDermott, Keke Palmer, Ryan Adams	3.56
Coach Ken Henderson; Ryan Adams performed "Gimme Something Good"; Ellen plays Epic or Fail with an audience member
1,878	18	October 1, 2014	Wanda Sykes, Alison Sweeney, Jason Aldean	3.56
11-year-old dancer; Jason Aldean performed "Burnin' It Down"; Allison Sweeney plays "30 Seconds or Else"; Who's In My Bushes? (appearance by Robert Downey Jr.);
1,879	19	October 2, 2014	Mario Lopez, Ma'ake, Chris Kemoeatu	3.56
"What's in the box?"; Hispanic American Heritage quiz; Throwback Thursday to April 3, 2008
1,880	20	October 3, 2014	Jane Lynch, Becky G(guest DJ)	3.56
Classic Joke Friday; New Drone Cameras; Ellen and Jane Lynch played "Lady Lovers" (hosted by Chris Harrison); The Kloons
1,881	21	October 6, 2014	Ice Cube, Steven Yeun	3.27
Audience Dance Contest (Stuff Your Cups); "Laugh Lessons" with David Spade; Sexual Harassment Training Video or Late Night Movie; Who's In My Bushes? (appearance by Ariana Grande); Ellen and Ice Cube play "Ice Breakers: Pick-Up Lines"
1,882	22	October 7, 2014	Josh Duhamel, Michael Pena, Lucy Hale(guest DJ)	3.27
Andy reads funny names; Josh Duhamel gets dunked; Lucy Hale performed "Lie a Little Better"; "Andy Zenor Walks Into a Bar"; Who's In My Bushes? (appearance by Eva Longoria)
1,883	23	October 8, 2014	Jennifer Garner, James Marsden, Fences & Macklemore, tWitch(guest DJ)	3.27
Ellen's Viagra commercial; "Black & White" (appearances by Wanda Sykes, Jesse Tyler Ferguson); Jennifer Garner and Ellen play Hoop Dee Do Me; Fences & Macklemore performed "Arrows"
1,884	24	October 9, 2014	Robert Downey Jr., Nicole Richie, Jack White, tWitch(guest DJ)	3.27
tWitch gets waxed; Who's In My Bushes? (appearance by Seth Rogen); Ellen plays Epic or Fail with Robert Downey Jr.; Nicole Richie stuffs her mouth with marshmallows; Jack White performed "Would You Fight For My Love?"
1,885	25	October 10, 2014	Shia LaBeouf, Gina Rodriguez, Padma Lakshmi, Meghan Trainor(guest DJ)	3.27
Ellen scares Andy with the Annabelle doll; Classic Joke Friday; "Weekly Tweetly Roundup"; Gina Rodriguez Salsa Lesson
1,886	26	October 13, 2014	Selena Gomez, Pink, Tyler Posey(guest DJ)	3.57
5th Annual Cat Week (Day 1); Channing Tatum calls Ellen (Nick the Gardener gets a role in Magic Mike 2); Nordstrom Hidden Camera Prank with Kym Douglas; Tyler Posey gets dunked
1,887	27	October 14, 2014	Portia de Rossi, David Walton'	3.57
5th Annual Cat Week (Day 2); The Price Is Right contestant who bid $7000 on a hammock; Ellen's "serious" interview with Portia de Rossi; Ellen plays Epic or Fail with Seth Rogen; Portia de Rossi gets dunked
1,888	28	October 15, 2014	Heidi Klum, Phaedra Parks	3.57
5th Annual Cat Week (Day 3); Ellen and the audience play Epic or Fail: Cat Edition; "Audience Singing"; 5-year-old dancer Heaven King; Heidi Klum gets dunked
1,889	29	October 16, 2014	Chelsea Handler, Bob Seger, John Mulaney	3.57
5th Annual Cat Week (Day 4); Throwback Thursday to January 4, 2007; Bob Seger performed Night Moves and "Hey Gypsy"; Inspiring 5-year old basketball fan (appearance by Gordon Hayward and Derrick Favors)
1,890	30	October 17, 2014	Channing Tatum, Zoe Saldaña, Diego Luna, Rosemarie DeWitt, Jessie J	3.57
5th Annual Cat Week (Day 5); Ellen works from home; Classic Joke Friday; NFL player Devon Still and his daughter; Face-Painting challenge with Channing Tatum, Zoe Saldaña, and Diego Luna; Jessie J performs "Bang Bang" and "Burnin' Up"
1,891	31	October 20, 2014	Lena Dunham, Melissa McCarthy	3.53
"Box Week"; Ellen plays "Heads Up!" with Lena Dunham and Melissa McCarthy
1,892	32	October 21, 2014	Kat Dennings, Sheppard	3.53
Kat Dennings played "60 Seconds or Else"; Sheppard performed "Geronimo"; Kevin the Car Driver pranked Honeymooners
1,893	33	October 23, 2014	Bill Murray, Shailene Woodley, Lady Antebellum	3.53
Disabled veteran Noah Galloway; Lady Antebellum performs "Freestyle"; "The Mattress Firm, Episode 1" starring Ellen, Bill Murray, and Lady Antebellum
1,894	34	October 24, 2014	Fergie, Casey Wilson	3.53
Amazing 8-year-old dancer; audience members play "Know or Go!"; "The Mattress Firm, Episode 2" starring Ellen and Fergie
1,895	35	October 25, 2014	Sean Hayes, Neil Diamond	3.53
"Homeworker Helperer"; Dancing duo from London called Duplic8; "The Mattress Firm Finale" starring Ellen and Sean Hayes
1,896	36	October 27, 2014	Taylor Swift	3.83
The true story of Annie Edson Taylor as told by Ellen; Taylor Swift performs "Shake It Off" and "Out of the Woods"; "Kitty Corner" with Taylor Swift and Ellen
1,897	37	October 28, 2014	Steve Harvey, Jenny Slate, Echosmith	3.83
Echosmith performs "Cool Kids"; Ellen surprises a group of breast cancer survivors
1,898	38	October 29, 2014	Jake Gyllenhaal, Derek Hough, Fall Out Boy, Pete Wentz and Patrick Stump (guest DJs)	3.83
Last-minute kids' costume ideas; incredible story of sportsmanship; Fall Out Boy performs "Centuries"; Derek Hough gets dunked
1,899	39	October 30, 2014	Nicole Kidman	3.83
Andy and Jaqueline visit a haunted house; Ellen and Nicole Kidman play "Country Song or Country Wrong"; Noah Ritter goes to the Texas State Fair; Ellen's audience plays "Let's Make a Trade"
1,900	40	October 31, 2014 (Halloween Show)	Daniel Radcliffe	3.83
Ellen pranks Daniel Radcliffe with an earthquake; Ellen sends Katie Lowes and Guillermo Diaz to a haunted house
1,901	41	November 3, 2014	Cameron Diaz, Jamie Foxx, Quvenzhané Wallis	3.88
Ellen and the audience play "Epic or Fail"; young piano prodigy; the cast of Annie (Diaz, Foxx, and Wallis) plays Jenga; "Cash at Your Store"
1,902	42	November 4, 2014	Viola Davis, Ella Henderson	3.88
"Texts from Your Ex"; viral video star Jayci Underwood; Ella Henderson performs "Ghost"; Ellen surprises a deserving audience member
1,903	43	November 5, 2014	Howie Mandel	3.88
Ellen's friend Kai Langer; Ellen and Steve Harvey hijack a tour bus; Ellen interviews "Alex from Target"
1,904	44	November 6, 2014	Anne Hathaway, 5 Seconds of Summer	3.88
"Laugh Lessons" with Sarah Silverman; Jeannie and Andy at the CMA Awards red carpet; 5 Seconds of Summer perform "Good Girls"; "5 Seconds with 5 Seconds of Summer"
1,905	45	November 7, 2014	Matthew McConaughey, Damon Wayans Jr.	3.88
Kevin Nealon at the Hello Kitty convention; eight friends play "Cash at Your Door"
1,906	46	November 10, 2014 (1900 Shows Celebration)	Christoph Waltz, Demi Lovato, The Vamps	3.99
Audience members play "The Together Sweater Game"; The Vamps and Demi Lovato perform "Somebody to You"
1,907	47	November 11, 2014	Bill Clinton, Pitbull, tWitch (guest DJ)	3.99
Pitbull performs "Celebrate"; tWitch teaches audience members to do the "Penguin Shake"
1,908	48	November 12, 2014	Sofía Vergara, Nick Jonas	3.99
Ellen learns Spanish from a telenovela star; audience singing; Ellen surprises a Navy hero; Nick Jonas performs "Jealous"
1,909	49	November 13, 2014	Jim Carrey, Minnie Driver, Mary J. Blige	3.99
Interesting toys that Ellen found; Mary J. Blige performs "Right Now"; Ellen goes holiday shopping
1,910	50	November 14, 2014	LL Cool J, The New Basement Tapes	3.99
Ellen and the audience play "Epic or Fail: Jet Ski Edition"; "The Really Real Realtor"; K-pop dancing twins Zony and Yony; The New Basement Tapes perform "Kansas City"
1,911	51	November 17, 2014	Elizabeth Banks, Kunal Nayyar	4.05
Ellen and Elizabeth Banks do bird impressions; "The Noah Ritter Show" with guest Sofía Vergara; Ellen and Kunal Nayyar play arcade basketball
1,912	52	November 18, 2014	Julianne Moore, Steve Spangler	4.05
Ellen's favorite singing audience member; 12 days to 12 Days of Giveaways; Ellen and Julianne Moore toss cream pies at two audience members; audience members play "Toss In the Towel for 12 Days"; finalists for Ellen's replacement gardener
1,913	53	November 19, 2014	Robin Roberts, Dave Grohl and Foo Fighters	4.05
Ellen's dream team; the heroic teen who saved a cop from a car fire; Ellen and Robin Roberts play "Guesstures"; Foo Fighters perform "In the Clear"
1,914	54	November 20, 2014	Jason Sudeikis, José Andrés	4.05
"Homeworker Helperer"; Rebel Wilson plays "Pitch Please" and unveils the first Pitch Perfect 2 trailer; Jason Sudeikis and his mom play "Heads Up Sidekick"; a deserving family plays "Cash at Your Store"
1,915	55	November 21, 2014	One Direction, Jimmy Page Judge Judy, Brick Heck, Manny Delgado, Lady Gaga	4.05
"Chairs' Farewell Tour" in Miami Beach; John David Glaude's weight loss success story; One Direction surprises a fan
1,916	56	November 24, 2014	Gwen Stefani, Pharrell Williams, Katie Holmes	3.98
Audience members play a Thanksgiving version of "What's In the Box?"; Pharrell Williams surprises Gwen Stefani; Ellen changes the life of a struggling mother in need; K-pop dancing twins Zony and Yony at Beauty and the Beast the musical; dance lessons with Katie Holmes
1,917	57	November 25, 2014	Jennifer Aniston, Garth Brooks	3.98
Ellen's fake boob product "Adjust-a-Bust"; Ellen and Jennifer Aniston play "Last Word"; Garth Brooks performs "Ain't Goin' Down ('Til the Sun Comes Up)" and "Mom"
1,918	58	November 26, 2014	Chris Pine	3.98
Chris Pine sings to a fan; a Salt-N-Pepa fan who rapped in her car; toy testing with Noah Ritter and Tre Hart
1,919	59	December 1, 2014	Tony Goldwyn, Sam Smith	3.85
Ellen plays "Heads Up (RED)" with an audience member; Home viewers Harva and Margo at the Mockingjay Part 1 red carpet; Ellen's live commercial for PayPal; Ellen surprises a deserving fan; Sam Smith performs "Not The Only One"
1,920	60	December 2, 2014	Jessica Chastain, Simon Baker, Bleachers	3.85
The Kloons' new video; Ellen meets a 14-year-old magician from Germany; Bleachers perform "Rollercoaster"
1,921	61	December 3, 2014	Eva Mendes, Tony Robbins, Trisha Yearwood	3.85
Ellen's "real reality roundup"; Ellen and Eva Mendes guess celebrity babies; Trisha Yearwood performs "PrizeFighter"; audience members play "Gifts Keep Falling on My Head"
1,922	62	December 4, 2014 (12 Days of Giveaways, Day 1)	Steve Carell	3.98
Ellen discusses meanings of emojis; Throwback Thursday (December 19, 2008): television accident on Day 12 of 2008's 12 Days; Ellen and Steve Carell act without a word and play "Heads Up"; Ellen surprises a deserving first grade teacher
1,923	63	December 5, 2014 (12 Days of Giveaways, Day 2)	Reese Witherspoon, Dan Bucatinsky, First Aid Kit	3.98
First Aid Kit performs "My Silver Lining"
1,924	64	December 8, 2014 (12 Days of Giveaways, Day 3)	Amy Poehler, tWitch (guest DJ)	4.27
Audience members play "Know or Go" holiday quiz; "Bad Paid-For Santa Photos"; Ellen meets an inspiring young amputee athlete
1,925	65	December 9, 2014 (12 Days of Giveaways, Day 4)	Lisa Kudrow, Max Greenfield	4.27
Ellen and Lisa Kudrow guess the real TV show titles
1,926	66	December 10, 2014 (12 Days of Giveaways, Day 5)	Orlando Bloom, Laura Dern	4.27
"Saint Nick or Rabbi Pic?"; Ellen surprises deserving viewer Susan Carr; Ellen and Orlando Bloom play "Heads Up"
1,927	67	December 11, 2014 (12 Days of Giveaways, Day 6)	Kevin Hart, Josh Gad	4.27
Throwback Thursday (December 16, 2008): Ellen goes caroling with Britney Spears; Twitter challenge at University of North Texas; two audience members play "Wedding Ring Toss" with Kevin Hart and Josh Gad for The Wedding Ringer movie tickets
1,928	68	December 12, 2014 (12 Days of Giveaways, Day 7)	Ashton Kutcher, tWitch (guest DJ)	4.27
Two audience members play "Big Snow Balla"; 11-year-old dancer Taylor; holiday beauty tips from Kym Douglas
1,929	69	December 15, 2014 (12 Days of Giveaways, Day 8)	Nicki Minaj, Skylar Grey	4.40
1,930	70	December 16, 2014 (12 Days of Giveaways, Day 9)	Jane Fonda	4.40
Ellen and the audience play "Epic or Fail: Winter Edition"
1,931	71	December 17, 2014 (12 Days of Giveaways, Day 10)	Leah Remini	4.40
Ellen and Leah Remini play "Stack Your Packages" and make a prank call to Leah's husband
1,932	72	December 18, 2014 (12 Days of Giveaways, Day 11)	Allison Janney	4.40
Ellen meets a 7-year-old James Bond expert; Ellen and Allison Janney play "Heads Up Pictures"
1,933	73	December 19, 2014 (12 Days of Giveaways, Day 12)	Owen Wilson	4.40
Ellen and Owen Wilson play "Snowy Balls"
1,934	74	December 22, 2014 (12 Days of Giveaways, Day 13)	Meryl Streep, Emily Blunt, Anna Kendrick, Craig Wayne Boyd	–
Ellen, Meryl Streep, Emily Blunt and Anna Kendrick play "Heads Up Pictures"
1,935	75	January 6, 2015	Joaquin Phoenix, Lea Michele, Joshua Radin	–
Audience members play "Power to the Peoples" for People's Choice Awards tickets; Joshua Radin performs "Beautiful Day"
1,936	76	January 7, 2015	Chris Pratt, Amanda Peet, Chet Faker	–
Chet Faker performs "Gold"
1,937	77	January 8, 2015	Harry Connick Jr., Eddie Redmayne	–
"Coachella Band or Cartoon Character"; Throwback Thursday: Ellen's trip to the Chicago Science Museum
1,938	78	January 9, 2015	Oprah Winfrey	–
Ellen, Oprah Winfrey, and cast members from Selma play "Heads Up"; Jim Parsons surprises two special kids
1,939	79	January 12, 2015	Kaley Cuoco-Sweeting, Melissa McCarthy	4.03
Ellen shares audience members' Facebook photos; Ellen surprises an Indianapolis sorority with all 12 Days of Giveaways; "Who's in My Bushes?" (surprise appearance by Melissa McCarthy)
1,940	80	January 13, 2015	Juliana Margulies, Bruno Mars, Mark Ronson	4.03
Bruno Mars and Mark Ronson perform "Uptown Funk!"; Ellen meets an inspiring entrepreneur and his plan to end hunger
1,941	81	January 14, 2015	Benedict Cumberbatch, Felicity Jones, Meghan Trainor	4.03
"Epic or Fail"; Benedict Cumberbatch does celebrity impersonations; Meghan Trainor performs "Lips Are Movin'"
1,942	82	January 15, 2015	Mariah Carey, Dax Shepard, Sharon van Etten	4.03
"It's a Jungle in the Amazon" (strange products on Amazon.com); Mariah Carey surprises fans in Vegas; Sharon van Etten performs "I Don't Want to Let You Down"
1,943	83	January 16, 2015	Rob Lowe	4.03
Audience members play "Sorry Spin"; Bruno Mars meets Ellen's friend Kai Langer; Ellen's announcer Ari helps a viewer fix up her house
1,944	84	January 19, 2015	Jennifer Aniston, Miyavi	–
Ellen and Jennifer Aniston play "Let Them Eat Cake"; Miyavi performs "Let Go"
1,945	85	January 20, 2015	Jennifer Lopez, Charlie Day, Florida Georgia Line	–
Ellen gives "6-Word Answers" to viewer questions; Ellen plays "Heads Up" with the entire audience"; Florida Georgia Line performs "Sun Daze"
1,946	86	January 21, 2015	Ewan McGregor, Becky G	–
The mountain climbers who scaled El Capitan talk to Ellen and play "Scotch on the Rocks" with Ellen and Ewan McGregor; Becky G performs "Can't Stop Dancin"; viral video twins Aaron and Austin
1,947	87	January 22, 2015	Johnny Depp, Gwyneth Paltrow, Paul Bettany, Sam Hunt	–
An 11-year-old entrepreneur from Detroit; Sam Hunt performs "Take Your Time"
1,948	88	January 23, 2015	Timothy Olyphant, George Ezra	–
Classic Joke Friday; Kevin the Cashier works at Target; George Ezra performs "Budapest"; a viewer wins all 12 Days of Giveaways
1,949	89	January 26, 2015 (Birthday Week, Day 1)	Keith Urban, Olivia Munn, Joe Biden	3.85
Audience members play "Honey, Can You Grab the Keys?" and "The Mercedes Race Around the Benz" for a new Mercedes-Benz car; surprise visit from Vice President Joe Biden
1,950	90	January 27, 2015 (Birthday Week, Day 2)	Kevin Costner, Kiesza	3.85
Ellen Skypes with two of her biggest fans; Kiesza performs "Sound of a Woman" and "Hideaway"; Ellen's funniest moments; Ellen plays "Heads Up" with the audience
1,951	91	January 28, 2015 (Birthday Week, Day 3)	Usher, Octavia Spencer	3.85
So You Think You Can Dance season 11 top six perform a routine to "Uptown Funk!"; Usher and Octavia Spencer play "Heads Up Sidekick"
1,952	92	January 29, 2015 (Ellen's Birthday Show)	Kanye West, Sam Smith	3.85
Surprise appearances by Justin Bieber and Drew Brees; Ellen's Covergirl screen test; world premiere of Kanye West's "Only One" music video; Sam Smith performs "Lay Me Down"; Ellen's writers at Aria Las Vegas
1,953	93	January 30, 2015 (Birthday Week, Day 5 / Super Bowl Show)	Jimmy Fallon, Sia'	3.85
Sia performs "Elastic Heart"
1,954	94	February 2, 2015	Viola Davis	3.85
Ellen promotes her Book Bar by having audience members play "What in the Word?"; Epic or Fail; Viola Davis plays "Heads Up"; surprise guest Nicole Kidman in Ellen's bushes
1,955	95	February 3, 2015	Mila Kunis, Dierks Bentley	3.85
Two of Ellen's viewers at Super Bowl XLIX; Ellen and Mila Kunis play "Stripper, I Hardly Know Her"; Dierks Bentley performs "Say You Do"; Ellen meets Humans of New York
1,956	96	February 4, 2015	Wanda Sykes	3.85
Surprise guest Channing Tatum unveils the first Magic Mike XXL trailer
1,957	97	February 5, 2015	Scott Foley	3.85
Throwback Thursday (February 5, 2004): Ellen goes door-to-door promoting her show; surprise guest Justin Bieber pranks audience members in the bathroom
1,958	98	February 6, 2015 (Grammys Show)	Jessica Alba, Terry Crews, Hozier	3.85
Ellen, LL Cool J and Ed Sheeran play "Lady Lovers"; Jessica Alba throws balls for charity; Hozier performs "From Eden"; an audience member plays "You Munchkin or You Can't" for Grammys tickets
1,959	99	February 9, 2015	Ryan Seacrest, Ed Sheeran	3.89
Audience members play a Las Vegas version of "What's In the Box?"; Ed Sheeran performs "Thinking Out Loud"
1,960	100	February 10, 2015	Anna Kendrick, Sam Smith, Annie Lennox,	3.89
Annie Lennox performs "I Put a Spell on You"
1,961	101	February 11, 2015	Connie Britton, Ricky Martin	3.89
Andy versus a child genius; Ricky Martin performs "Adios"; Valentine's Day beauty tips with Kym Douglas
1,962	102	February 12, 2015	Michael Keaton, Rosamund Pike	3.89
"Tinder Nightmares"; Throwback Thursday (April 6, 2012): Ellen reads from "Fifty Shades of Grey"; Kevin the Cashier works at See's Candies
1,963	103	February 13, 2015 (Valentine's Day Show)	Sarah Hyland, Mario Lopez	3.89
1,964	104	February 16, 2015	Kristen Bell	4.38
Epic or Fail: Presidents' Day Edition; 5-year-old presidential expert Macey Hensley; Justin Bieber prank calls a fan
1,965	105	February 17, 2015	Keira Knightley, Wendi McLendon-Covey	4.38
Ellen throws a surprise bachelor party; an audience member plays "Heads Up" for a trip to Las Vegas; Wendi McLendon-Covey discusses hosting Repeat After Me, the hidden camera show Ellen produces
1,966	106	February 18, 2015	Neil Patrick Harris, Shemar Moore	4.38
The woman who survived a car fire and the man who saved her; Ellen and Neil Patrick Harris play "Heads Up Pictures"; iPad magician Simon Pierro; Shemar Moore kicks soccer balls for charity
1,967	107	February 19, 2015	Kerry Washington	4.38
Ellen's friend Noah Ritter goes to Hawaii
1,968	108	February 20, 2015	Justin Bieber, Imagine Dragons	4.38
Ellen's announcer Ari at Mardi Gras; "6-Word Answers" to viewers' Oscars questions; "Cash at Your Door"; Imagine Dragons perform "I Bet My Life" and "Demons"
1,969	109	February 23, 2015	Ed O'Neill, The Bachelor Chris Soules	3.93
Audience members play an Oscars edition of "What's In the Box?"; Ellen's writers Kevin and Lauren on the Oscars red carpet; Ellen's announcer Ari and four best friends go on a road trip in Napa; Ellen meets an inspiring 12-year-old boy with a rare disease
1,970	110	February 24, 2015	Will Smith, Little Big Town	3.93
Audience members play "Two Truths and a Lie" with Will Smith; Little Big Town performs "Girl Crush"
1,971	111	February 25, 2015	Julie Bowen, Fifth Harmony	3.93
Two audience members play "Today's Grabbing News" for a trip to Las Vegas; Fifth Harmony performs "Sledgehammer"
1,972	112	February 26, 2015	Jeff Garlin, Matt Lauer	3.93
Strange dating websites Ellen found on the internet; "Word from Your Mother"; Epic or Fail; Ellen and Matt Lauder play "Never Have I Ever"; Ellen's brand ambassador Taniya Nayak promotes QVC's "E.D. On Air" decor collection
1,973	113	March 2, 2015	Nicole Richie, Derek Hough, Julianne Hough	3.86
Audience members play "What in the Word?"; Ellen's staff meets the Bachelor Chris Soules; Ellen's 8-year-old "boyfriend" Tayt Andersen; Nicole Richie, Derek and Julianne Hough play "Cards Against Humanity"
1,974	114	March 3, 2015	Cate Blanchett, Matthew Rhys	3.86
Ellen interviews the owner of "#TheDress"; Cate Blanchett identifies her co-stars by their lips; two audience members play "Oh, Let's Go to Orlando" for a trip to Universal Orlando Resort
1,975	115	March 4, 2015	Ellen Pompeo, Nick Jonas	3.86
Nick Jonas performs "Chains"
1,976	116	March 5, 2015	Vince Vaughn, Megan Boone	3.86
Two audience members play "Ring-a-Ding-Ding, It's Almost Spring"; Megan Boone on starring in The Blacklist; Throwback Thursday (January 13, 2005): Ellen on the set of a Jennifer Lopez music video
1,977	117	March 9, 2015	Lena Dunham, Jussie Smollett	3.19
Audience members play "Blindfolded Musical Bachelor Chairs"; an Arkansas college student and the police officer who changed his life; Lena Dunham faces the "Hashtag Bag"; Jussie Smollett performs "Good Enough"
1,978	118	March 10, 2015	Amy Poehler, Bill Hader, Walk the Moon	3.19
Epic or Fail; Amy Poehler and Bill Hader unveil a trailer for their movie Inside Out and play Heads Up; Walk the Moon perform "Shut Up and Dance"
1,979	119	March 11, 2015	Mindy Kaling, Earth, Wind & Fire, Michael Kelly	3.19
Ellen's announcer Ari gives "Reality Show Summ-Aris" of Hot GRITS and Sex Box; Matthew Noszka, the odd-jobs worker who became a model because of an Instagram picture; Earth, Wind & Fire perform "Let's Groove" and "Boogie Wonderland"
1,980	120	March 12, 2015	Lea Michele, Chris Colfer, Jenna Ushkowitz, Darren Criss, Chord Overstreet, Ne-Yo, Juicy J	–
Ellen's Target scavenger hunt; the cast of Glee plays "Cards Against Humanity"; Ne-Yo and Juicy J perform "She Knows"
1,981	121	March 16, 2015 (Madonna Week, Day 1)	Michelle Obama, Bellamy Young, Courtney Barnett	–
Ellen and Michelle Obama do the "Gimme Five" dance; Courtney Barnett performs "Depreston"
1,982	122	March 17, 2015 (Madonna Week, Day 2)	Madonna, Elisha Cuthbert, Nick Zano, Kelly Brook, Guillermo Diaz (guest DJ)	–
Weird toys Ellen found on eBay; "Andy Zenor Walks Into a Bar..."; Madonna performs "Living for Love"; cast members of the sitcom One Big Happy
1,983	123	March 18, 2015 (Madonna Week, Day 3)	Justin Bieber, Jane Krakowski, Madonna	3.19
Madonna and Justin Bieber play "Never Have I Ever"; Justin Bieber goes undercover as a security guard pranking audience members; Madonna performs "Joan of Arc"; Jane Krakowski plays "Heads Up"
1,984	124	March 19, 2015 (Madonna Week, Day 4)	Ellie Kemper, Madonna	3.93
Ellen demonstrates "technology you can wear"; Madonna performs "Ghosttown"; Ellen surprises a deserving teacher
1,985	125	March 20, 2015 (Madonna Week, Day 5)	Jim Parsons, Bridgit Mendler, Madonna	3.89
Three audience members play "Know or Go"; Classic Joke Friday; 4-year-old dancer Heaven and mom Tianne perform; Ellen's "Bathroom Concert Series" with Madonna, Madonna's thirteenth studio album to promote Rebel Heart; two audience members play "Slap Ellen's Face" for a trip to Las Vegas
1,986	126	March 22, 2015	Halle Berry, Hilary Duff, Tori Kelly	3.46
Ellen surprises some of her fans in the UK; Ellen and Halle Berry play "Stuff Your Cups"; Tori Kelly performs "Nobody Love"
1,987	127	March 23, 2015	Ringo Starr, Vin Diesel, Ludacris	3.46
Young dancing duo from Vancouver, Lucky Aces; two audience members play "Diesel Dash to Abu Dhabi" with Vin Diesel for a trip to Abu Dhabi; Ludacris performs "Good Lovin'"
1,988	128	April 1, 2015	Dwayne Johnson, Ashley Benson, Charlie Wilson	3.46
Charlie Wilson performs "Touched by an Angel"; Dwayne Johnson and Ashley Benson play "Dwayne, Paper, Scissors"
1,989	129	April 2, 2015	Van Halen, Tony Goldwyn, Kimberly Snyder, Drew Barrymore	3.46
"80s Hair Band or Pretty Pony"; treadmill dancer Carson Dean; Tony Goldwyn plays "Heads Up"; Van Halen performs "Jump"; Kimberly Snyder cooks with Ellen and Drew Barrymore
1,990	130	April 3, 2015	Kelly Clarkson, James Van Der Beek	3.46
Kelly Clarkson performs "Heartbeat Song"
1,991	131	April 6, 2015	Kate Walsh, Rumer Willis, Valentin Chmerkovskiy	3.34
Rumer and Val from Dancing with the Stars perform
1,992	132	April 7, 2015	Ricky Gervais, Darius Rucker, Bethany Mota	3.34
Ricky Gervais plays "Pitch Please"; Darius Rucker performs "Homegrown Honey"; Ellen and Bethany Mota give audience members makeovers
1,993	133	April 8, 2015	Amy Schumer, Mark Ronson, Mystikal	3.34
Audience members play "Walk the Plank" for MTV Movie Awards tickets; Ellen's announcer Ari visits a sorority at Ohio State University; Mark Ronson and Mystikal perform "Feel Right"
1,994	134	April 9, 2015	Bette Midler, Bethenny Frankel, Joey Soloway	3.34
Bette Midler performs "Be My Baby"
1,995	135	April 13, 2015	Sofia Vergara, Reese Witherspoon, Jason Derulo	3.33
"Just Kid Ink"; Ellen's sitcom "The Three Sofias" with Sofia Vergara, Reese Witherspoon, and Jason Derulo; Jason Derulo performs "Want To Want Me"; Ellen surprises a deserving family with a home makeover; Epic or Fail
1,996	136	April 14, 2015	Chris Hemsworth, Randall Park	3.33
Two audience members play "Score with Thor" with Chris Hemsworth for Avengers: Age of Ultron tickets; Australian female comedy trio SketchShe
1,997	137	April 15, 2015	Jeremy Renner, Rose Byrne, Wiz Khalifa, Charlie Puth	3.33
Two audience members test their texting skills playing "Fast Fingers of Fate"; Jeremy Renner plays "Heads Up"; Wiz Khalifa and Charlie Puth perform "See You Again"; Ellen and Rose Byrne play "Guesstures"
1,998	138	April 16, 2015	Michael Douglas, Rosario Dawson	3.33
North Carolina family whose new baby's gender reveal video went viral; Michael Douglas' "body of work" montage; Ellen surprises a deserving first-grade teacher
1,999	139	April 20, 2015	Felicity Huffman, The War on Drugs, Noah Galloway, Sharna Burgess	3.52
The BuzzFeed reporter and the Chinese man (nicknamed "Brother Orange") who had the reporter's stolen iPhone; Ellen and Felicity Huffman play "5-Second Rule"; The War on Drugs performs "Red Eyes"; Noah and Sharna from Dancing with the Stars perform; Ellen's announcer Ari helps lucky viewers with their spring cleaning
2,000	140	April 21, 2015	Courteney Cox, Edie Falco, Wendi McLendon-Covey	3.52
Courteney Cox reads reviews of her directorial debut and plays "Heads Up!"; 16-year-old model Lucky Blue Smith
2,001	141	April 22, 2015	Wanda Sykes, Candice Bergen, Natalie La Rose, Jeremih	3.52
Wanda Sykes auditions to narrate the nature documentary Monkey Kingdom; Natalie La Rose and Jeremih perform "Somebody"; Candice Bergen discusses her new memoir; Ellen surprises a deserving viewer with new appliances and a home makeover
2,002	142	April 23, 2015	Chris Pratt, Carly Rae Jepsen	3.52
Epic or Fail; Chris Pratt and Ellen's friend Noah Ritter play "Dino Wrong or Dino Right"; Carly Rae Jepsen performs "I Really Like You"; Ellen surprises a military mother with a new car and a reunion; Noah's day out at Boomers! with his grandpa Jack and Ellen's promo announcer Robbie
2,003	143	April 24, 2015	Victoria Beckham, Katie Lowes	3.34
Victoria Beckham plays "Tats on Becks" to earn money for charity; Mexican girl rock band The Warning performs Ozzy Osbourne's "Crazy Train"; Cash at Your Door
2,004	144	April 27, 2015	Jake Gyllenhaal, Kunal Nayyar	3.35
Audience members play "What's In the Box?"; Jake Gyllenhaal answers trivia questions while jumping rope to earn money for charity; Ellen surprises a deserving single mother from Toronto
2,005	145	April 28, 2015	Kevin Spacey, Tim McGraw	3.35
5-year-old presidential expert Macey Hensley visits the White House; Macey and Kevin Spacey play "Spacey vs. Macey: Presidential Edition"; Tim McGraw performs "Something Like That"
2,006	146	April 29, 2015	Sean "Diddy" Combs, Shawn Mendes	3.35
"'What's Wrong with These Photos?' Photos"; Kevin the Cashier works at Dodger Stadium; Ellen guesses Sean Combs' big announcement, or else he has to drink shots of vodka; Shawn Mendes performs "Stitches"; Ellen surprises a teacher in need
2,007	147	April 30, 2015	Scarlett Johansson, Chris Evans, Idina Menzel, Adam Lambert	3.35
Scarlett Johansson and Chris Evans play "Avenger? I Hardly Know Her"; Idina Menzel sings "Let It Go" in Japanese; Adam Lambert performs "Ghost Town"
2,008	148	May 1, 2015	Jack Black, Alison Sweeney	3.35
Classic Joke Friday; Andy Zenor at the Avengers: Age of Ultron premiere; young dancing duo Lucky Aces perform at an Ariana Grande concert; Jack Black rides a mechanical bull to earn money for charity; Alison Sweeney on her return to Days of Our Lives and her Hallmark Channel movie Murder, She Baked; an inspiring firefighter couple's home makeover
2,009	149	May 4, 2015	Sofia Vergara, Melissa Rivers	–
"Bad Paid-For Photos"; Ellen throws a surprise bachelorette party for Sofia Vergara; Ellen and Sofia play "Heads Up!" in Spanish; Melissa Rivers on her new book about her late mother Joan; Ellen surprises two best friends with a vacation
2,010	150	May 5, 2015	Jamie Foxx, Britney Spears	–
Britney Spears makes a surprise visit; Jamie Foxx defends his criticized National Anthem performance during the Mayweather vs. Pacquiao fight and performs "Baby's In Love"
2,011	151	May 6, 2015	Diane Keaton, Hailee Steinfeld	–
Twin dancers Zony and Yony return; Diane Keaton faces Ellen's bowl of questions; Hailee Steinfeld on her Met Gala dress and Pitch Perfect 2; Ellen surprises a terrible "Sorry Spin" contestant with a new car
2,012	152	May 7, 2015	Kristen Wiig, My Morning Jacket	–
"Bad Paid-For Photos Live"; "'What's Wrong with These Signs?' Signs"; Ellen scares Kristen Wiig; My Morning Jacket performs "Big Decisions"
2,013	153	May 8, 2015 (Mother's Day Show)	Mark Wahlberg, Mario Lopez	–
"Yo mama" jokes from Kristen Wiig, Jamie Foxx and Scott Foley; giveaways for an audience of expecting mothers and a deserving home viewer; Mark Wahlberg on his family van and Ted 2
2,014	154	May 11, 2015	Scott Foley, Brittany Snow	3.46
Ellen plays "Heads Up!" with the entire audience; "A Little Yelp from My Friends" (Yelp reviews); "Complete the Beat"; twin dancers Zony and Yony return
2,015	155	May 12, 2015	Anna Kendrick	3.89
"You've Got Me Texting Emojis"; Ellen and Anna Kendrick play "Oh Caption, My Caption"; 9-year-old piano prodigy Elias Phoenix returns; scavenger hunt at Dicks's Sporting Goods
2,016	156	May 13, 2015	Elizabeth Banks	3.89
Audience members play "Know or Go!"; an inspiring child becomes guest DJ with tWitch; Ellen and Elizabeth Banks play "5 Second Rule"
2,017	157	May 14, 2015	Jane Fonda, Hilary Duff	3.89
Epic or Fail; Throwback Thursday (November 17, 2011): Ellen operates a Hollywood tour bus; Ellen and Jane Fonda play "Never Have I Ever"; Hilary Duff performs "Sparks"
2,018	158	May 15, 2015	Jennifer Lopez	3.89
Jennifer Lopez performs a medley of her greatest hits
2,019	159	May 18, 2015	Sandra Bullock, James Bay	3.89
Surprise appearance by Mariah Carey; Ellen and Sandra Bullock play "Heads Up!"; James Bay performs "Hold Back the River"
2,020	160	May 19, 2015	Drew Barrymore, Zac Efron, Luke Bryan	3.89
Zac Efron becomes Ellen's "guest gardener" and unveils a trailer for We Are Your Friends; 5-year-old presidential expert Macey Hensley visits the Reagan Library; Luke Bryan performs "Kick the Dust Up" and plays "Know Your Country" with Macey
2,021	161	May 20, 2015	Melissa McCarthy, Tove Lo	3.89
Audience members play "Let's Make a Trade"; Ellen celebrates her mama's 85th birthday; Tove Lo performs "Talking Body"; a montage of Ellen's viewer giveaways
2,022	162	May 21, 2015	Pamela Anderson, Tyler Oakley	3.89
Ellen and Pamela Anderson play "5 Second Rule"; two audience members play "Fast Fingers of Fate"
2,023	163	May 22, 2015	Joseph Gordon-Levitt	3.89
Audience members play "What's In the Box?"; Joseph Gordon-Levitt on season two of HitRecord on TV; So You Think You Can Dance all-stars perform; summer beauty tips from Kym Douglas; Epic or Fail
2,024	164	May 26, 2015	Josh Groban	3.85
Josh Groban gets scared by Ellen and performs "What I Did for Love"; Ellen meets Aydian Dowling, who could become the first transgender male cover model
2,025	165	May 27, 2015	Beth Behrs, Kendrick Lamar	3.85
Ellen and the audience play "Never Have I Ever"; Beth Behrs plays "Heads Up!" while running on a treadmill; Kendrick Lamar performs "These Walls"; science guy Steve Spangler's best moments
2,026	166	June 1, 2015	David Spade, Jonathan Groff, Imagine Dragons	3.85
Three audience members play "Know or Go"; "'What's Wrong with These Signs?' Signs"; David Spade discusses Joe Dirt 2: Beautiful Loser and plays "Heads Up"; Imagine Dragons perform "Shots"; Jonathan Groff on his HBO series Looking
2,027	167	June 2, 2015	Allison Janney, Jimmie Johnson	3.85
Ellen and Allison Janney play "Never Have I Ever"
2,028	168	June 3, 2015	Sarah Silverman, Sergei Polunin	3.85
Epic or Fail; Sergei Polunin dances to Hozier's "Take Me to Church"; a college fan plays "Cash at Your Door"
2,029	169	June 4, 2015	Adrian Grenier, Kevin Connolly, Kevin Dillon, Jerry Ferrara, Kelly Clarkson	3.85
The cast of Entourage plays "Never Have I Ever"; Kelly Clarkson performs "Invincible"; Ellen meets two inspirational prom dates
2,030	170	June 5, 2015	Howie Mandel, Loni Love	3.85
Exclusive sneak preview of Magic Mike XXL; Howie Mandel's unexpected cameo in Magic Mike XXL; Ellen meets two of her British fans; Loni Love learns to be a fairy
Special	Special	June 8, 2015 (Kids Ellen Loves)	Featured: Lucky Aces, Harmony Zhu, Macey Hensley, Noah Ritter, Kai Langer, Tayt Anderson, Heaven King	3.85
Special	Special	June 9, 2015 (Ellen's Favorite Moments)	Featured: Matt Lauer, Kevin Hart, Josh Gad, Oprah Winfrey, Sofía Vergara, Reese Witherspoon, Jason Derulo, Madonna, Justin Bieber, Mark Ronson, Bruno Mars, Jennifer Aniston, Portia de Rossi	3.85
Special	Special	June 11, 2015 (Ellen's Favorite Games with Celebrities)	–	3.85
Special	Special	June 12, 2015 (Ellen's Hot Guys)	–	3.85
