= The Ellen DeGeneres Show season 18 =

The Ellen DeGeneres Show
- Season 18
- Starring: Ellen DeGeneres
- No. of episodes: 185

Release
- Original release: September 21, 2020 – July 9, 2021

Season chronology
- ← Previous; Season 17 Next → Season 19

The eighteenth season of The Ellen DeGeneres Show (often stylized as ellen18) began airing on Monday, September 21, 2020.

== Episodes ==
No. overall	No. in season	Original release date	Guests
2,932	1	September 21, 2020	Tiffany Haddish
2,933	2	September 22, 2020	Kerry Washington, America's Got Talent semi-finalists W.A.F.F.L.E. Crew
2,934	3	September 23, 2020	Alec Baldwin, SuperM
2,935	4	September 24, 2020	Kris Jenner
2,936	5	September 25, 2020	Derek Hough, Allison Holker Boss, Addison Rae
Guest Host tWitch
2,937	6	September 28, 2020	Blake Shelton, Tristan Harris
2,938	7	September 29, 2020	Amy Schumer
2,939	8	September 30, 2020	Jason Sudeikis, America's Got Talent winner Brandon Leake
2,940	9	October 1, 2020	Chris Rock
2,941	10	October 2, 2020	Justina Machado, Kalen Allen, World of Dance winners
Guest Host tWitch
2,942	11	October 5, 2020	Adam Sandler
2,943	12	October 6, 2020	Brad Paisley, Jurnee Smollett
2,944	13	October 7, 2020	Orlando Bloom, Gloria Steinem, Tig Notaro
2,945	14	October 8, 2020	Sarah Silverman, Jeff Foxworthy, Bon Jovi
2,946	15	October 9, 2020	Jane Fonda
Guest Host Tiffany Haddish
2,947	16	October 12, 2020	Michael Che
2,948	17	October 13, 2020	The Best of Season 18… So Far!
2,949	18	October 14, 2020	Kristen Bell, Steve Spangler
2,950	19	October 15, 2020	Colin Jost, Future Islands
2,951	20	October 16, 2020	Jason Derulo
2,952	21	October 19, 2020	Marlon Wayans
Guest Host Tiffany Haddish
2,953	22	October 20, 2020	Ken Jeong, Jaylen Brown, AJR
2,954	23	October 21, 2020	Sarah Hyland, Chasten Buttigieg
2,955	24	October 22, 2020	Chelsea Handler
2,956	25	October 23, 2020	Bethenny Frankel, Local Natives
2,957	26	October 26, 2020	Ashley Graham, Skai Jackson, SAINt JHN
Guest Host tWitch
2,958	27	October 27, 2020	Justin Hartley, Keith Barry
2,959	28	October 28, 2020	Thomas Middleditch
2,960	29	October 29, 2020	Khloé Kardashian
2,961	30	October 30, 2020	Howie Mandel
Ellen’s Big Halloween Show!
2,962	31	November 2, 2020	Sacha Baron Cohen, Sarah Cooper, Clayton Kershaw
2,963	32	November 3, 2020	Wanda Sykes
2,964	33	November 4, 2020	Jennifer Aniston, President Obama, Adele, & More!
Ellen’s Favorite Moments
2,965	34	November 5, 2020	Magic Johnson, Catherine & India Oxenberg, 24kGoldn
2,966	35	November 6, 2020	Lily Tomlin
2,967	36	November 9, 2020	Anthony Anderson
Guest Host Sarah Silverman
2,968	37	November 10, 2020	Jimmy Kimmel
2,969	38	November 11, 2020	Usher
2,970	39	November 12, 2020	Vince Vaughn, Mario Lopez, Why Don't We
2,971	40	November 13, 2020	Robin Roberts
Guest Host Garth Brooks
2,972	41	November 16, 2020	Matthew McConaughey, Gabby Barrett
2,973	42	November 17, 2020	Sarah Paulson
2,974	43	November 18, 2020	Patrick Dempsey
2,975	44	November 19, 2020	Melissa McCarthy
2,976	45	November 20, 2020	Ludacris, Dr. Ruth
Guest Host Tiffany Haddish
2,977	46	November 23, 2020	Goldie Hawn & Kurt Russell, Ben Falcone
Day 1 of 12 Days of Giveaways!
2,978	47	November 24, 2020	Jake Tapper, Dierks Bentley
Day 2 of 12 Days of Giveaways!
2,979	48	November 25, 2020	Josh Duhamel
Day 3 of 12 Days of Giveaways!
2,980	49	November 30, 2020	Gayle King, Alison Brie
Day 4 of 12 Days of Giveaways!
2,981	50	December 1, 2020	Justin Bieber, Russell Dickerson
Day 5 of 12 Days of Giveaways!
2,982	51	December 2, 2020	Aubrey Plaza, Lil Nas X
Day 6 of 12 Days of Giveaways!
2,983	52	December 3, 2020	Diane Keaton, Isla Fisher
Day 7 of 12 Days of Giveaways!
2,984	53	December 4, 2020	Bryan Cranston, Anya Taylor-Joy
Day 8 of 12 Days of Giveaways!
2,985	54	December 7, 2020	Kate Mara
Day 9 of 12 Days of Giveaways!
2,986	55	December 8, 2020	Chance the Rapper
Day 10 of 12 Days of Giveaways!
2,987	56	December 9, 2020	Leslie Odom Jr., Tayshia Adams
Day 11 of 12 Days of Giveaways!
2,988	58	January 13, 2021	Jake Tapper, Ashley McBryde, Dr. Sanjay Gupta
Day 12 of 12 Days of Giveaways!
2,989	59	January 14, 2021	Jim Parsons, Mayim Bialik, Chet Faker
2,990	60	January 15, 2021	Jessica Alba, Harry Shum Jr.
Guest Host tWitch
2,991	61	January 18, 2021	Justin Timberlake, Dance Theatre of Harlem
2,992	62	January 19, 2021	Howie Mandel, Pete Yorn
2,993	63	January 20, 2021	Thomas Middleditch
2,994	64	January 21, 2021	Pharrell Williams, Joe Buck, ASHE
2,995	65	January 22, 2021	Charles Barkley, Michelle Buteau
2,996	66	January 25, 2021	Priyanka Chopra Jonas, Ingrid Andress
2,997	67	January 26, 2021	Dax Shepard, José Andrés, Amanda Gorman
2,998	68	January 27, 2021	Ted Danson, Lilly Singh
2,999	69	January 28, 2021	Laverne Cox
3,000	70	January 29, 2021	Hosts of The Real, and Nikki & Brie Bella
Guest Host Mario Lopez
3,001	71	February 1, 2021	Tracee Ellis Ross, Rita Wilson
3,002	72	February 2, 2021	Rachel Maddow, Kane Lim, Carly Pearce
3,003	73	February 3, 2021	A Look Back at Ellen’s Favorite Football Moments
3,004	74	February 4, 2021	Eric Stonestreet
3,005	75	February 5, 2021	Samantha Bee, Captain Lee Rosbach
3,006	76	February 8, 2021	Chrissy Teigen
3,007	77	February 9, 2021	Mila Kunis
3,008	78	February 10, 2021	Anderson Cooper, 'The Masked Zoomer'
3,009	79	February 11, 2021	Wanda Sykes
3,010	80	February 12, 2021	Ciara & Russell Wilson, Jon Dorenbos
Guest Host tWitch
3,011	81	February 15, 2021	Kat Dennings
3,012	82	February 16, 2021	Allison Janney
3,013	83	February 17, 2021	Kenan Thompson, Maria Bakalova
3,014	84	February 18, 2021	Neil Patrick Harris, The Masked Dancer Winner
3,015	85	February 19, 2021	Randy Jackson, Dean Edwards
Guest Host Tiffany Haddish
3,016	86	February 22, 2021	Demi Lovato, Sam Fischer
3,017	87	February 23, 2021	Mary J. Blige, Jas Leverette, I Dont Know How but They Found Me
3,018	88	February 24, 2021	Colin Jost, Jamie Kern Lima
3,019	89	February 25, 2021	Jane Fonda
3,020	90	February 26, 2021	Taye Diggs, Nasty C & Ari Lennox
Guest Host Tiffany Haddish
3,021	91	March 1, 2021	Heidi Klum, Leslie Jordan, Jackelyn Shultz
Guest Host Howie Mandel
3,022	92	March 2, 2021	Eddie Murphy, Bella Murphy, The Kid Laroi
3,023	93	March 3, 2021	Melissa McCarthy & Octavia Spencer, Kristen Bell & Dax Shepard, Brandy Clark
3,024	94	March 4, 2021	Paul Bettany, Maluma
3,025	95	March 5, 2021	Randall Park, Allison Holker Boss, Zara Larsson
Guest Host tWitch
3,026	96	March 8, 2021	Cedric the Entertainer, Jhené Aiko, Kings of Leon
3,027	97	March 9, 2021	Jesse Tyler Ferguson, Sara Gilbert
3,028	98	March 10, 2021	Rosamund Pike, Niecy Nash, Black Pumas
3,029	99	March 11, 2021	Jennifer Garner, Maren Morris
3,030	100	March 12, 2021	Hilary Duff
Guest Host Brooke Baldwin
3,031	101	March 15, 2021	Kyle Chandler, All Time Low
3,032	102	March 16, 2021	Michelle Obama
3,033	103	March 17, 2021	Gwen Stefani, Javicia Leslie, Rita Ora
3,034	104	March 18, 2021	Katie Couric, Giada De Laurentiis
3,035	105	March 19, 2021	Garth Brooks, Antonia Gentry, Paloma Mami
Guest Host tWitch
3,036	106	March 22, 2021	Steve Harvey, Meduza and Dermot Kennedy
3,037	107	March 23, 2021	Ellie Kemper, Lake Street Dive
3,038	108	March 24, 2021	Robin Roberts, Drew Brees, Kelly Marie Tran, Joshua Bassett
3,039	109	March 25, 2021	Kris Jenner, Madison Beer
3,040	110	March 26, 2021	Joe Manganiello, Dominique Fishback
Guest Host tWitch
3,041	111	March 29, 2021	Courtney Lopez, Allison Holker Boss
Guest Host Mario Lopez, Elizabeth Berkley Lauren
3,042	112	March 30, 2021	Beth Behrs, Miles Brown, Seventeen
Guest Host tWitch
3,043	113	March 31, 2021	Tracy Morgan, FITZ
Guest Host tWitch
3,044	114	April 1, 2021	Kelly Rowland, Angelica Ross
Guest Host Kalen Allen
3,045	115	April 2, 2021	Martha Stewart, John Stamos
Guest Host Howie Mandel
3,046	116	April 5, 2021	John Cena, Danielle Brooks
3,047	117	April 6, 2021	Lupita Nyong’o, Jeremy Lin
3,048	118	April 7, 2021	Don Johnson, Nicole Byer
3,049	119	April 8, 2021	Lauren Graham, Giveon
3,050	120	April 9, 2021	Susan Kelechi Watson
Guest Host tWitch
3,051	121	April 12, 2021	Mark Wahlberg, Brandi Carlile, Nessa Barrett
3,052	122	April 13, 2021	Melissa Villaseñor, Tones and I
3,053	123	April 14, 2021	Savannah Guthrie, Brett Eldredge, Tamara Levitt
3,054	124	April 15, 2021	Keith Urban, Dean Lewis
3,055	125	April 16, 2021	Andra Day, Lil Rel Howery, Tomorrow X Together
Guest Host Tiffany Haddish
3,056	126	April 19, 2021	Jessica Biel, Olivia Holt, Michelle Buteau, Glass Animals
3,057	127	April 20, 2021	Ed Helms, Barbara Corcoran
3,058	128	April 21, 2021	Scott Foley, Jane Levy, Hunter Hayes, Dr. Andrew Weil
3,059	129	April 22, 2021	Mickey Guyton, Dr. Julian Fennessy
Ellen's Earth Day Show
3,060	130	April 23, 2021	Amy Schumer
Guest Host Ashley Graham
3,061	131	April 26, 2021	Michael Strahan, Daniel Dae Kim, Kym Douglas
3,062	132	April 27, 2021	Mark Cuban, Jay Shetty, Ingrid Michaelson
3,063	133	April 28, 2021	Gayle King, Ellen Bennett, Miranda Lambert, Jack Ingram & Jon Randall
3,064	134	April 29, 2021	Adam Levine & Maroon 5
Ellen’s 3,000th Show
3,065	135	April 30, 2021	Topher Grace, Caleb McLaughlin
Guest Host Anthony Anderson
3,066	136	May 3, 2021	Justin Theroux, Bethenny Frankel, Cameron Jay
3,067	137	May 4, 2021	Luke Bryan, Emmanuel Acho
3,068	138	May 5, 2021	Michael Che, Thomas Rhett
3,069	139	May 6, 2021	Courteney Cox, Julia Michaels
3,070	140	May 7, 2021	Ayesha Curry
Ellen's Mother’s Day Show
3,071	141	May 10, 2021	Michael B. Jordan, Rag'n'Bone Man
3,072	142	May 11, 2021	P!nk, Imagine Dragons
3,073	143	May 12, 2021	The Cast of ‘Mom’, Machine Gun Kelly
3,074	144	May 13, 2021	Oprah Winfrey, P!nk
3,075	145	May 14, 2021	Ellie Kemper
3,076	146	May 17, 2021	Daymond John, Brené Brown
3,077	147	May 18, 2021	Wanda Sykes
3,078	148	May 19, 2021	Stacey Abrams, Dave Bautista, Lady A
3,079	149	May 20, 2021	Jake Tapper, Tig Notaro, Hunter Metts
3,080	150	May 21, 2021	Kathryn Hahn, Adam Scott
Guest Host Rob Lowe
3,081	151	May 24, 2021	Van Jones, Ryleigh Modig
3,082	152	May 25, 2021	Seth Meyers, Yvonne Orji, Travon Free
3,083	153	May 26, 2021	Kevin Hart, Florida Georgia Line
3,084	154	May 27, 2021	Chris Pratt, Melissa King
3,085	155	May 28, 2021	Matthew McConaughey, Jon Dorenbos
Guest Hosts Garth Brooks & Trisha Yearwood
3,086	156	May 31, 2021	Ryan Tedder, Glennon Doyle, OneRepublic
3,087	157	June 1, 2021	James Corden, Patti Harrison, Average Andy with Drew Brees
3,088	158	June 2, 2021	Emma Stone, Ziwe, Mimi Webb
3,089	159	June 3, 2021	Sofía Vergara, Cam Anthony, Wim Hof
3,090	160	June 4, 2021	Lisa Kudrow, Mae Martin, Thuso Mbedu, Kym Douglas
3,091	161	June 7, 2021	Ricky Martin, Carey Hart, Crowded House
3,092	162	June 8, 2021	Garcelle Beauvais, Winnie Harlow, Anson Seabra
Guest Host tWitch
3,093	163	June 9, 2021	Kevin Nealon, TWICE
3,094	164	June 10, 2021	Sean Hayes, Joshua Radin
3,095	165	June 11, 2021	Howie Mandel, Bryce Vine
3,096	166	June 14, 2021	Debbie Allen, Madeline Brewer
Guest Host tWitch
3,097	167	June 15, 2021	Salma Hayek, Darci Lynne
3,098	168	June 16, 2021	Heidi Klum, Jon Devore
3,099	169	June 17, 2021	David Harbour, Offset
Guest Host tWitch
3,100	170	June 18, 2021	Jesse Williams, D Smoke, Kalen Allen
Guest Host tWitch
3,101	171	June 21, 2021	Cecily Strong, Ann Dowd
3,102	172	June 22, 2021	Chris Bridges, James TW
3,103	173	June 23, 2021	Henry Golding, Damien Caillaud & Irbain Ngobobo, Berywam
3,104	174	June 24, 2021	Blake Shelton, Minnie Driver
3,105	175	June 25, 2021	Casey Wilson, JP Saxe
Guest Host tWitch
3,106	176	June 28, 2021	Tyrese Gibson, Kimberly Clark
Guest Host Tiffany Haddish
3,107	177	June 29, 2021	Kristen Bell, Wiz Khalifa
Guest Host Chelsea Handler
3,108	178	June 30, 2021	Don Cheadle, Ilana Glazer
Guest Host Wanda Sykes
3,109	179	July 1, 2021	Robin Wright, Fortune Feimster
Guest Host Chelsea Handler
3,110	180	July 2, 2021	Jay Pharoah, Jon M. Chu
Guest Host tWitch
3,111	181	July 5, 2021	Jeannie Mai, Jon Pardi, Shaheem Sanchez
Guest Host tWitch
3,112	182	July 6, 2021	Bobby Berk, Tichina Arnold, Lady A
Guest Host Beth Behrs
3,113	183	July 7, 2021	RuPaul, Saweetie, John Kanell
Guest Host Loni Love
3,114	184	July 8, 2021	Regina Hall, Jimmie Allen, Parson James & JoJo
Guest Host tWitch
3,115	185	July 9, 2021	Adrienne Houghton, Tate McRae
Guest Host tWitch
