= The Ellen DeGeneres Show season 11 =

The Ellen DeGeneres Show
- Season 11
- Starring: Ellen DeGeneres
- No. of episodes: 168 + 2 specials

Release
- Original release: September 9, 2013 – June 3, 2014

Season chronology
- ← Previous; Season 10 Next → Season 12

This is a list of episodes of the eleventh season of The Ellen DeGeneres Show (often stylized as e11en), which aired from September 4, 2013 to June 3, 2014.

== Episodes ==
No. overall	No. in season	Original release date	Guests	U.S. viewers (millions)
1,693	1	September 9, 2013	Leah Remini, Stephen "tWitch" Boss (guest DJ)	3.59
1,694	2	September 10, 2013	Simon Cowell, Kelly Rowland, Diana Nyad, Olivia Munn (guest DJ)	3.59
1,695	3	September 11, 2013	Celine Dion, Sam Horowitz	3.59
1,696	4	September 12, 2013	Ray Romano, Amber Riley, Derek Hough, Jennifer Nettles, tWitch (guest DJ)	3.59
1,697	5	September 13, 2013	Andy Samberg, Mel B, Darren Young, Earth, Wind & Fire	3.59
1,698	6	September 16, 2013	Hugh Jackman, NeNe Leakes, Emblem3, Nolan Gould (guest DJ)	3.38
1,699	7	September 17, 2013	Chris Hemsworth, Ciara (guest DJ)	3.38
1,700	8	September 18, 2013	Gwyneth Paltrow, Patrick Wilson, Josh Groban, tWitch (guest DJ)	3.38
1,701	9	September 19, 2013	Pink, Zendaya, tWitch (guest DJ)	3.38
1,702	10	September 20, 2013	Eric Stonestreet, Drake, Ylvis, tWitch (guest DJ)	3.38
1,703	11	September 23, 2013	Jim Carrey, Nick Cannon, Ellie Kemper (guest DJ)	3.48
1,704	12	September 24, 2013	Jason Biggs, Anna Gunn, Carmen Electra (guest DJ)	3.48
1,705	13	September 25, 2013	Elton John, Lauren Graham, Snooki (guest DJ)	3.48
1,706	14	September 26, 2013	Zooey Deschanel, Ricky Martin, Kunal Nayyar (guest DJ)	3.48
1,707	15	September 27, 2013	Julie Bowen, Nicki Minaj, Lee DeWyze, Mario Lopez (guest DJ)	3.48
1,708	16	September 30, 2013	Justin Timberlake	3.31
1,709	17	October 1, 2013	LL Cool J, Capital Cities	3.31
1,710	18	October 2, 2013	Jessica Alba, Jenna Dewan-Tatum, Chris Young	3.31
1,711	19	October 3, 2013	Sean Hayes, Keith Urban, Jennifer Lopez, Ryan Seacrest, Harry Connick Jr., D. L. Hughley, Beth Behrs (guest DJ)	3.31
1,712	20	October 4, 2013	Daniel Radcliffe, Jack Osbourne, Cheryl Burke	3.31
1,713	21	October 7, 2013	Julianne Moore, Demi Lovato, Christina Milian (guest DJ)	3.35
1,714	22	October 8, 2013	Kate Hudson, Steve Martin, Edie Brickell, tWitch (guest DJ)	3.35
1,715	23	October 9, 2013	Jack Black, Joshua Malina, Lorde, Shemar Moore (guest DJ)	3.35
1,716	24	October 10, 2013	Patrick Dempsey, Mike O'Malley, Fall Out Boy, Pete Wentz & Patrick Stump (guest DJs)	3.35
1,717	25	October 11, 2013	Miley Cyrus, tWitch (guest DJ)	3.35
1,718	26	October 14, 2013	Kat Dennings, Beth Behrs, tWitch (guest DJ)	3.37
1,719	27	October 15, 2013	Wanda Sykes, Jared Leto, Fitz and the Tantrums, Jason Derulo (guest DJ)	3.37
1,720	28	October 16, 2013	Owen Wilson, Woody Harrelson, Rosie Perez, tWitch (guest DJ)	3.37
1,721	29	October 17, 2013	Pamela Anderson, Jimmy Buffett, Nelly (guest DJ)	3.37
1,722	30	October 18, 2013	Alyson Hannigan, Corbin Bleu, Karina Smirnoff, tWitch (guest DJ)	3.37
1,723	31	October 21, 2013	Viola Davis, Snooki, JWoww, tWitch (guest DJ)	3.56
1,724	32	October 22, 2013	Ethan Hawke, Lady Antebellum, Hélio Castroneves (guest DJ)	3.56
1,725	33	October 23, 2013	Shania Twain, Bon Jovi, Bellamy Young, Anže Kopitar, tWitch (guest DJ)	3.56
1,726	34	October 24, 2013	Amy Poehler, Ellie Goulding, Joey Fatone (guest DJ)	3.56
1,727	35	October 25, 2013	Sean "Diddy" Combs, Mary Steenburgen, Elizabeth Berkley, Valentin Chmerkovskiy, Tori Kelly	3.56
1,728	36	October 28, 2013	Keith Urban, Michael Ealy, Romany Malco (guest DJ)	3.86
1,729	37	October 29, 2013	Rachel McAdams, Hailee Steinfeld, Kevin Nealon	3.86
1,730	38	October 30, 2013	Ed O'Neill, Alma Deutscher, Derek Hough (guest DJ)	3.86
1,731	39	October 31, 2013 (Halloween Show)	Alison Sweeney, tWitch (guest DJ)	3.86
1,732	40	November 1, 2013	Jennifer Garner, Derek Hough (guest DJ)	3.86
1,733	41	November 4, 2013	Melissa McCarthy, Pentatonix, Sophia Grace & Rosie	4.01
1,734	42	November 5, 2013	Matthew McConaughey, Taye Diggs, James Blunt, Robyn Lawley, Adam Lambert (guest DJ)	4.01
1,735	43	November 6, 2013	Ashton Kutcher, José Andrés, Sting, Loni Love (guest DJ)	4.01
1,736	44	November 7, 2013	Kaley Cuoco, Pamela Anderson, Ryan Sweeting, Steve Spangler, The Wanted (guest DJs)	4.01
1,737	45	November 8, 2013	Rob Lowe, Sophia Grace & Rosie, Paris Hilton (guest DJ)	4.01
1,738	46	November 11, 2013 (1700 Shows Celebration)	Rebel Wilson, Adam Lambert (guest DJ)	4.00
1,739	47	November 12, 2013	Emma Thompson, Lenny Kravitz, Carmen Electra (guest DJ)	4.00
1,740	48	November 13, 2013	Matt Lauer, Kellie Pickler	4.00
1,741	49	November 14, 2013	Kerry Washington, David Morrissey, Loni Love (guest DJ)	4.00
1,742	50	November 15, 2013	Channing Tatum, Chris Pratt, The Killers, Sophia Grace and Rosie	4.00
1,743	51	November 18, 2013	James Franco, Anna Faris, Sophia Grace & Rosie, Donald Driver (guest DJ)	4.06
1,744	52	November 19, 2013	Kanye West, Elizabeth Banks, Loni Love (guest DJ)	4.06
1,745	53	November 20, 2013	Fergie, Kym Douglas	4.06
1,746	54	November 21, 2013	Robin Williams, Pharrell Williams, Ellie Kemper (guest DJ)	4.06
1,747	55	November 22, 2013	Simon Cowell, Mario Lopez, Fifth Harmony, tWitch (guest DJ)	4.06
1,748	56	November 25, 2013	Lady Gaga, tWitch (guest DJ)	4.14
1,749	57	November 26, 2013	Kristen Bell, Jason Mraz, Travie McCoy, 2 Chainz (guest DJ)	4.14
1,750	58	November 27, 2013	Hayden Panettiere, Luke Bryan	4.14
1,751	59	November 29, 2013	Garth Brooks, Paulina Rubio, Loni Love (guest DJ)	4.14
1,752	60	December 2, 2013	Allison Janney, Gavin DeGraw, Chord Overstreet, (guest DJ)	4.18
1,753	61	December 3, 2013	Britney Spears, John Legend, Cirque du Soleil	4.18
1,754	62	December 4, 2013	Ben Stiller, Steve Coogan, Bastille, Loni Love (guest DJ)	4.18
1,755	63	December 5, 2013 (12 Days of Giveaways, Day 1)	Adam Levine, Nate Berkus, tWitch(guest DJ)	4.18
1,756	64	December 6, 2013 (12 Days of Giveaways, Day 2)	Kelly Clarkson, tWitch (guest DJ)	4.18
1,757	65	December 9, 2013 (12 Days of Giveaways, Day 3)	Jake Gyllenhaal, Loni Love (guest DJ)	4.41
1,758	66	December 10, 2013 (12 Days of Giveaways, Day 4)	Carey Mulligan, Maria Sharapova, Phoenix, Candice Swanepoel (guest DJ)	4.41
1,759	67	December 11, 2013 (12 Days of Giveaways, Day 5)	Tom Hanks, Andrew McCutchen, Loni Love (guest DJ)	4.41
1,760	68	December 12, 2013 (12 Days of Giveaways, Day 6)	Lea Michele, James Wolpert (guest DJ)	4.41
1,761	69	December 13, 2013 (12 Days of Giveaways, Day 7)	Tyler Perry, Ken Jeong, Tired Pony, tWitch (guest DJ)	4.41
1,762	70	December 16, 2013 (12 Days of Giveaways, Day 8)	Colin Farrell, Kathryn Hahn, Kings of Leon, tWitch (guest DJ)	4.18
1,763	71	December 17, 2013 (12 Days of Giveaways, Day 9)	Chris O'Donnell, Terry Bradshaw, Icona Pop (guest DJ)	4.18
1,764	72	December 18, 2013 (12 Days of Giveaways, Day 10)	Julia Roberts (special co-host), Julia Louis-Dreyfus, Martha Stewart, tWitch (guest DJ)	4.18
1,765	73	December 19, 2013 (12 Days of Giveaways, Day 11)	Amy Adams, Mary J. Blige, Michael B. Jordan, Ellie Kemper (guest DJ)	4.18
1,766	74	December 20, 2013 (12 Days of Giveaways, Day 12)	Katy Perry, John Mayer, Paul Feig, tWitch (guest DJ)	4.18
1,767	75	December 23, 2013 (12 Days of Giveaways, Day 13)	Eddie Murphy, David Thibault, tWitch (guest DJ)	4.18
1,768	76	January 7, 2014	Leonardo DiCaprio, Courteney Cox, Sara Bareilles, Loni Love (guest DJ)	4.30
1,769	77	January 8, 2014	Mark Wahlberg, Taylor Kitsch, Tamar Braxton, Loni Love (guest DJ)	4.30
1,770	78	January 9, 2014	Joseph Gordon-Levitt, Kym Whitley, tWitch (guest DJ)	4.30
1,771	79	January 10, 2014	Matt LeBlanc, Jared Leto, Thirty Seconds to Mars, tWitch (guest DJ)	4.30
1,772	80	January 13, 2014	Drew Barrymore, Kenneth Branagh, Camren Anthony, tWitch (guest DJ)	4.08
1,773	81	January 14, 2014	Julianna Margulies, Chiwetel Ejiofor, John Newman, tWitch (guest DJ)	4.08
1,774	82	January 15, 2014	Jennifer Lopez, Keith Urban, Harry Connick Jr., Sharon Jones & the Dap-Kings, Loni Love (guest DJ)	4.08
1,775	83	January 16, 2014	Chris Pine, Quinn Sullivan, Loni Love (guest DJ)	4.08
1,776	84	January 17, 2014	Kim Kardashian, Dermot Mulroney, tWitch (guest DJ)	4.08
1,777	85	January 20, 2014	Meryl Streep, Vanessa Hudgens, tWitch (guest DJ)	4.36
1,778	86	January 21, 2014	Seth Meyers, Busy Philipps, Alison Sweeney (guest DJ)	4.36
1,779	87	January 22, 2014	Kirstie Alley, Wendi McLendon-Covey, Zane Beadles, Loni Love (guest DJ)	4.36
1,780	88	January 23, 2014	Joel McHale, June Squibb, tWitch (guest DJ)	4.36
1,781	89	January 24, 2014	Ellie Kemper (special host), Neil Patrick Harris, Hunter Hayes	4.36
1,782	90	January 27, 2014	Timothy Olyphant, Ellie Kemper, Jennifer Nettles (guest DJ)	4.60
1,783	91	January 28, 2014	Jane Lynch, Macklemore & Ryan Lewis, Jake Bugg, Hunter Hayes	4.60
1,784	92	January 29, 2014	Jay Leno, Terry Crews, Loni Love (guest DJ)	4.60
1,785	93	January 30, 2014 (Ellen's Birthday Show)	Zac Efron, Fitz and the Tantrums, Loni Love (guest DJ); Birthday Greetings: Michelle Obama, Ben Stiller, Drew Barrymore, Melissa McCarthy, Guillermo Díaz, Kerry Washington, Adam Levine	4.60
1,786	94	January 31, 2014 (Super Bowl Show)	Michael J. Fox, Max Greenfield, Aloe Blacc, Mario Lopez (guest DJ)	4.60
1,787	95	February 3, 2014	Jesse Tyler Ferguson	4.66
1,788	96	February 4, 2014	Sofía Vergara, Jessica Bassett	4.66
1,789	97	February 5, 2014	Kunal Nayyar, Wolfgang Puck, Cheryl Burke (guest DJ)	4.66
1,790	98	February 6, 2014	Channing Tatum, Kate McKinnon, Darlene Love & Judith Hill (guest DJs)	4.66
1,791	99	February 7, 2014	Steve Harvey, American Authors	4.66
1,792	100	February 10, 2014	Bruno Mars, Jessica Alba	3.35
1,793	101	February 11, 2014	Kevin Hart, tWitch (guest DJ)	3.35
1,794	102	February 12, 2014	Eva Mendes, Melissa McCarthy, Ben Falcone, Chris Paul	3.35
1,795	103	February 13, 2014	Cameron Diaz, Kevin Nealon	3.35
1,796	104	February 14, 2014	Kevin Costner, Band of Horses	3.35
1,797	105	February 17, 2014	Bradley Cooper, tWitch (guest DJ)	3.48
1,798	106	February 18, 2014	Harry Connick Jr., Rebel Wilson, Gabrielle Union, Jamie Anderson	3.48
1,799	107	February 19, 2014	Jonah Hill, Lionel Richie, CeeLo Green	3.48
1,800	108	February 20, 2014	David Spade, Kym Douglas	3.48
1,801	109	February 21, 2014	Jessica Lange, Lupita Nyong'o, Steve Spangler, tWitch (guest DJ)	3.48
1,802	110	February 24, 2014	Tim Allen, tWitch (guest DJ)	3.97
1,803	111	February 25, 2014	Minnie Driver	3.97
1,804	112	February 26, 2014	Jimmy Kimmel, Allison Williams, David Wise, tWitch (guest DJ)	3.97
1,805	113	March 3, 2014 (Live, Post-Oscars Show)	Cate Blanchett, Jared Leto, Lupita Nyong'o, Max Greenfield (guest DJ)	4.20
1,806	114	March 5, 2014	Sarah Jessica Parker, Cage the Elephant, Dan Bucatinsky, Theresa Caputo	4.20
1,807	115	March 11, 2014	Ricky Gervais, Joe Manganiello, Toni Braxton, Babyface, tWitch (guest DJ)	3.58
1,808	116	March 12, 2014	Randy Jackson, Maria Menounos, Panic! at the Disco	3.58
1,809	117	March 13, 2014	George Lopez, Jesse Metcalfe	3.58
1,810	118	March 14, 2014	Wanda Sykes, Jordana Brewster, Cirque du Soleil's Michael Jackson: One	3.58
1,811	119	March 17, 2014	Howie Mandel, Meryl Davis, Charlie White	3.77
1,812	120	March 18, 2014	Kate Winslet, Josh Radnor, Lake Street Dive	3.77
1,813	121	March 19, 2014	Ty Burrell, Arianna Huffington, Lea Michele	3.77
1,814	122	March 20, 2014	Barack Obama, Lauren Graham, Shaun White, Brandy Clark, Derek and Julianne Hough (guest DJs)	3.77
1,815	123	March 21, 2014	Jennifer Lopez, Theresa Caputo, Hunter Hayes	3.77
1,816	124	March 24, 2014	Jason Bateman (special co-host), Emma Watson, Mac Lethal, Brandy Clark, Emil De Leon	3.77
1,817	125	March 31, 2014	Lindsay Lohan, Amy Schumer, tWitch (guest DJ)	3.59
1,818	126	April 1, 2014	Jennifer Love Hewitt, Cheryl Hines, tWitch (guest DJ)	3.59
1,819	127	April 2, 2014	Simon Baker, Anthony Mackie, Sophia Grace and Rosie	3.59
1,820	128	April 3, 2014	Luke Bryan, B. J. Novak, Andrew Kelly, Kym Douglas	3.59
1,821	129	April 4, 2014	Andrew Garfield, Emma Stone, Jamie Foxx, Dan + Shay, tWitch (guest DJ)	3.59
1,822	130	April 7, 2014	Greg Kinnear, NeNe Leakes, Aloe Blacc, Sara Maria Forsberg	3.17
1,823	131	April 8, 2014	Viola Davis, Kate Mara, Steven Tyler, Joe Perry	3.17
1,824	132	April 9, 2014	Rob Lowe (special co-host), Guillermo Diaz	3.17
1,825	133	April 10, 2014	Pharrell Williams, Zooey Deschanel, Chadwick Boseman	3.17
1,826	134	April 11, 2014	Johnny Depp, Rebecca Hall, Paul Bettany, Miranda Lambert, tWitch (guest DJ)	3.17
1,827	135	April 14, 2014	Eva Longoria, Clark Gregg, Pharrell Williams, tWitch (guest DJ)	3.29
1,828	136	April 15, 2014	Kate Walsh, Marlon Wayans, Ellie Goulding	3.29
1,829	137	April 16, 2014	Billy Crystal, Dax Shepard, Frank Turner, tWitch (guest DJ)	3.29
1,830	138	April 17, 2014	Chelsea Handler, Elisabeth Moss, Jason Derulo	3.29
1,831	139	April 18, 2014	Kristen Bell, Tony Hale, Needtobreathe, tWitch (guest DJ)	3.29
1,832	140	April 21, 2014	Ice Cube, Drew Carey, Cheryl Burke, tWitch (guest DJ)	3.46
1,833	141	April 22, 2014	Ellen Pompeo, Phillip Phillips	3.46
1,834	142	April 23, 2014	Annette Bening, Loni Love, tWitch (guest DJ)	3.46
1,835	143	April 24, 2014 (1800 Shows Celebration)	Adam Levine, Usher	3.46
1,836	144	April 25, 2014	Mary-Kate Olsen, Ashley Olsen, Kunal Nayyar	3.46
1,837	145	April 28, 2014	LL Cool J, Amy Purdy, Derek Hough, Tony Okungbowa (guest DJ)	3.83
1,838	146	April 29, 2014	Robin Roberts, Carla Bruni	3.83
1,839	147	April 30, 2014	Ryan Seacrest, Dave Franco, tWitch (guest DJ)	3.83
1,840	148	May 1, 2014	Seth Rogen, Christina Hendricks, Rixton	3.83
1,841	149	May 2, 2014	Beth Behrs, Minnie Driver, Ricky Martin, tWitch (guest DJ)	3.83
1,842	150	May 5, 2014	Megan Fox, Taye Diggs, tWitch (guest DJ)	3.51
1,843	151	May 6, 2014	Kevin Spacey, Alison Sweeney, Ariana Grande	3.51
1,844	152	May 7, 2014	Julia Roberts, Ray LaMontagne	3.51
1,845	153	May 8, 2014	Connie Britton, Ellie Kemper, tWitch (guest DJ)	3.51
1,846	154	May 9, 2014 (Mother's Day Show)	Mila Kunis, Keith Urban	3.51
1,847	155	May 12, 2014	Eric Stonestreet, Ludacris	3.53
1,848	156	May 13, 2014	Maya Rudolph, Sean Hayes, tWitch (guest DJ)	3.53
1,849	157	May 14, 2014	Emily Blunt, Ansel Elgort, tWitch (guest DJ)	3.53
1,850	158	May 15, 2014	Allison Janney, Sophia Grace and Rosie, Florida Georgia Line	3.53
1,851	159	May 16, 2014	Amanda Seyfried, Ed Sheeran	3.53
1,852	160	May 19, 2014	Adam Sandler, Drew Barrymore, Kevin Nealon, Terry Crews, Wendi McLendon-Covey, Sia, Maddie Ziegler, Sophia Grace and Rosie, tWitch (guest DJ)	3.40
1,853	161	May 20, 2014	Halle Berry, Tim McGraw	3.40
1,854	162	May 21, 2014	Charlize Theron, Seth MacFarlane, Coldplay, Loni Love (guest DJ)	3.40
1,855	163	May 22, 2014	Jim Parsons, Sasha Alexander, Hozier, Bars & Melody	3.40
1,856	164	May 23, 2014	Diane Keaton, Taylor Kitsch, Jason Mraz	3.40
1,857	165	May 27, 2014	Elliot Page, Katie Lowes, Jhené Aiko, tWitch (guest DJ)	3.32
1,858	166	May 28, 2014	Leah Remini, OneRepublic, tWitch (guest DJ)	3.32
1,859	167	May 29, 2014	Jeff Bridges, Loni Love (guest DJ)	3.32
1,860	168	May 30, 2014	Wanda Sykes, Matt Bomer	3.32
Special	Special	June 2, 2014 (Ellen's Best Kids Moments)	R5	–
Special	Special	June 3, 2014 (Best of Ellen's Celebrity Guests)	Clips include (in order of appearance): Britney Spears, Psy, Melissa McCarthy, Meryl Streep, Emma Thompson, Zac Efron, Taylor Swift, Julia Roberts, Julia Louis-Dreyfus, Martha Stewart, David Beckham, Matthew Perry; Live Performance: Ed Sheeran	–
