= The Ellen DeGeneres Show season 10 =

The Ellen DeGeneres Show
- Season 10
- Starring: Ellen DeGeneres
- No. of episodes: 168 + 2 specials

Release
- Original release: September 10, 2012 – June 13, 2013

Season chronology
- ← Previous; Season 9 Next → Season 11

This is a list of episodes of the tenth season of The Ellen DeGeneres Show, which aired from September 10, 2012 to June 13, 2013.

== Episodes ==
No. overall	No. in season	Original release date	Guests
1,525	1	September 10, 2012	Pink, Patrick Dempsey, Gabby Douglas, McKayla Maroney, Kyla Ross
1,526	2	September 11, 2012	Simon Cowell, Britney Spears, Psy
1,527	3	September 12, 2012	Allison Janney, Dave Matthews Band
1,528	4	September 13, 2012	Kate Hudson, Little Big Town
1,529	5	September 14, 2012	Lauren Graham, Phillip Phillips
1,530	6	September 17, 2012	Kellie Pickler, Bethenny Frankel, So You Think You Can Dance Top Four
1,531	7	September 18, 2012	Clint Eastwood, Carly Rae Jepsen, Pattie Mallette
1,532	8	September 19, 2012	Michael J. Fox, L.A. Reid, Psy, Vince Vaughn, Owen Wilson
1,533	9	September 20, 2012	Amy Poehler, Ricky Gervais
1,534	10	September 21, 2012	Dennis Quaid, Jenna Dewan-Tatum
1,535	11	September 24, 2012	Viola Davis, Pamela Anderson, Bethenny Frankel
1,536	12	September 25, 2012	Zooey Deschanel, Maggie Elizabeth Jones, No Doubt
1,537	13	September 26, 2012	Joseph Gordon-Levitt, Kerry Washington, No Doubt
1,538	14	September 27, 2012	Jennifer Garner, Dwight Howard
1,539	15	September 28, 2012	Selena Gomez, Kobe Bryant, The Killers
1,540	16	October 1, 2012	Liam Neeson, Cher Lloyd
1,541	17	October 2, 2012	Lea Michele, Matchbox Twenty
1,542	18	October 3, 2012	Eric Dane, The Situation, Pauly D, Ronnie Ortiz-Magro, Vinny Guadagnino, OneRepublic
1,543	19	October 4, 2012	Zac Efron, Rebel Wilson, Ed Sheeran
1,544	20	October 5, 2012	Annette Bening, Cheryl Hines, Shawn Johnson, Derek Hough
1,545	21	October 8, 2012	Colin Farrell, Nolan Gould, Cody Simpson
1,546	22	October 9, 2012	Matthew Perry, Justin Bartha, Jennifer Livingston
1,547	23	October 10, 2012	Eric Stonestreet, Rachel Maddow, Joshua Radin
1,548	24	October 11, 2012	Octavia Spencer, Bethenny Frankel
1,549	25	October 12, 2012	Kate Walsh, Mike Epps, Tegan and Sara
1,550	26	October 15, 2012	Joel McHale, Anthony Robles, The Script, Sabrina Bryan, Louis Van Amstel
1,551	27	October 16, 2012	Emma Watson, Kym Douglas, D.L. Hughley, The Wallflowers
1,552	28	October 17, 2012	Matthew Fox, Justin Willman, Ellie Goulding
1,553	29	October 18, 2012	Nicole Richie, Nina Conti
1,554	30	October 22, 2012	Jessica Lange, Gilles Marini, Hunter Hayes
1,555	31	October 23, 2012	Portia de Rossi, Jerry O'Connell, LL Cool J
1,556	32	October 24, 2012	Helen Hunt, Mason Cook
1,557	33	October 25, 2012	Taylor Swift
1,558	34	October 26, 2012	Halle Berry, Zendee Rose Tenerefe
1,559	35	October 29, 2012	Madonna, Rocco Ritchie
1,560	36	October 30, 2012	Steve Harvey, Macklemore & Ryan Lewis
1,561	37	October 31, 2012 (Halloween Show)	Jane Lynch, Ellie Kemper, Sofia Vergara
1,562	38	November 1, 2012	Emmitt Smith, Cheryl Burke, Sophia Grace & Rosie
1,563	39	November 2, 2012	Denzel Washington, Jenna Fischer, Luke Bryan
1,564	40	November 5, 2012	Julie Bowen, Peter Facinelli, Elizabeth Reaser
1,565	41	November 6, 2012	Heidi Klum, Nikki Reed, Mackenzie Foy
1,566	42	November 7, 2012	Russell Brand, Bethenny Frankel
1,567	43	November 8, 2012	Miley Cyrus, Jackson Rathbone, Maggie Grace
1,568	44	November 9, 2012	Robert Pattinson, Taylor Lautner, Kirstie Alley
1,569	45	November 12, 2012	Adam Levine, Jennifer Hudson, Maroon 5
1,570	46	November 13, 2012	Andrew Garfield, Alison Eastwood, Donald Schultz, Ne-Yo
1,571	47	November 14, 2012	Rihanna, Blue Man Group, Hurricane Sandy Survivors
1,572	48	November 15, 2012	Keira Knightley, One Direction
1,573	49	November 16, 2012	Vanessa Williams, Jason Aldean
1,574	50	November 19, 2012	Alyson Hannigan, Sophia Grace & Rosie
1,575	51	November 20, 2012	Jesse Tyler Ferguson, Kelly Clarkson
1,576	52	November 21, 2012	Jennifer Lawrence
1,577	53	November 26, 2012	Ray Romano, Stephen "tWitch" Boss, Cirque du Soleil's Kiriki
1,578	54	November 27, 2012	Ellen Pompeo, Jason Sudeikis, Miguel
1,579	55	November 28, 2012	Khloe Kardashian, Damian Lewis, Jane Lynch, Jonas Brothers
1,580	56	November 29, 2012	Tim Allen, Kunal Nayyar
1,581	57	November 30, 2012	Wanda Sykes, Kevin Pollak
1,582	58	December 3, 2012 (12 Days of Giveaways, Day 1)	Jessica Biel, Damon Wayans Jr.
1,583	59	December 4, 2012 (12 Days of Giveaways, Day 2)	Gerard Butler, Martha Plimpton, Giada De Laurentiis
1,584	60	December 5, 2012 (12 Days of Giveaways, Day 3)	John Travolta, Olivia Newton-John, Mario Lopez
1,585	61	December 6, 2012 (12 Days of Giveaways, Day 4)	Drew Barrymore, Cory Monteith
1,586	62	December 7, 2012 (12 Days of Giveaways, Day 5)	Christina Aguilera
1,587	63	December 10, 2012 (12 Days of Giveaways, Day 6)	Fergie, Nathan Lane
1,588	64	December 11, 2012 (12 Days of Giveaways, Day 7)	Naomi Watts, J.R. Martinez
1,589	65	December 12, 2012 (12 Days of Giveaways, Day 8)	Howie Mandel, Tom Shadyac, Idina Menzel
1,590	66	December 13, 2012 (12 Days of Giveaways, Day 9)	Amanda Seyfried, Usher
1,591	67	December 14, 2012 (12 Days of Giveaways, Day 10)	Hugh Jackman, Justin Bieber
1,592	68	December 17, 2012 (12 Days of Giveaways, Day 11)	Anne Hathaway, Cee Lo Green
1,593	69	December 18, 2012 (12 Days of Giveaways, Day 12)	Bradley Cooper, Bruno Mars
1,594	70	December 19, 2012	Megan Fox, Eddie Redmayne, Bethenny Frankel
1,595	71	December 20, 2012	Jamie Foxx, Rosemarie DeWitt
1,596	72	January 3, 2013	Alison Sweeney, Allen Stone
1,597	73	January 4, 2013	Timothy Olyphant, Sarah Hyland, Halle Berry, Justin Flom
1,598	74	January 7, 2013	Courteney Cox, Kevin Hart
1,599	75	January 8, 2013	Kaley Cuoco, Padma Lakshmi, Mariel Madrid
1,600	76	January 9, 2013	Ricky Gervais, Kevin Nealon, Bethenny Frankel
1,601	77	January 10, 2013	Emma Stone, Common, Joe Manganiello
1,602	78	January 11, 2013	Nicole Kidman, Jimmy Kimmel, The Wanted
1,603	79	January 14, 2013	Keith Urban, Savannah Guthrie
1,604	80	January 15, 2013	Nicki Minaj, Caroline Pla
1,605	81	January 16, 2013	Jennifer Lopez, Kyle Chandler, Phillip Phillips
1,606	82	January 17, 2013	Mark Wahlberg, Josh Hopkins
1,607	83	January 18, 2013	Kat Dennings, Chris Kluwe, Macklemore & Ryan Lewis
1,608	84	January 21, 2013	Chris Colfer, Pauly D
1,609	85	January 22, 2013	Chris Pratt, Michael Chiklis, Tayt Andersen
1,610	86	January 23, 2013	Simon Baker, NeNe Leakes
1,611	87	January 24, 2013	Kristen Bell, Cedric the Entertainer
1,612	88	January 25, 2013 (Ellen's Birthday Show)	Jude Law, Katy Perry, Blind Pilot
1,613	89	January 28, 2013	Sean Hayes, Jillian Michaels
1,614	90	January 29, 2013	Sally Field, Quvenzhané Wallis, Justin Bieber
1,615	91	January 30, 2013	Catherine Zeta-Jones, Nicholas Hoult
1,616	92	January 31, 2013	Ryan Seacrest
1,617	93	February 1, 2013 (Super Bowl Show, Portia's Birthday)	Chris Tucker, Nolan Gould, Kevin Nealon, Sean Hayes
1,618	94	February 4, 2013	Kiefer Sutherland, Sophia Grace & Rosie, Dailius Wilson & Julian Wilson
1,619	95	February 5, 2013	Jessica Chastain, Tim McGraw
1,620	96	February 6, 2013 (1600th Show)	Melissa McCarthy, Jacki Weaver
1,621	97	February 7, 2013	Eric Stonestreet, Emeli Sandé
1,622	98	February 8, 2013	Ewan McGregor, Matthew Terry
1,623	99	February 11, 2013	David Spade, The Lumineers
1,624	100	February 12, 2013	Al Gore, Bruno Mars, Kathie Lee Gifford, Hoda Kotb
1,625	101	February 13, 2013	Mila Kunis, Tegan and Sara
1,626	102	February 14, 2013	Sofia Vergara, Josh Groban
1,627	103	February 15, 2013	Josh Duhamel, Bethenny Frankel, Alicia Keys
1,628	104	February 18, 2013	Chelsea Handler, Sophia Grace & Rosie
1,629	105	February 19, 2013	Dennis Quaid, Snooki, JWoww
1,630	106	February 20, 2013	Wanda Sykes, Kate Upton
1,631	107	February 21, 2013	Russell Brand, Wolfgang Puck
1,632	108	February 22, 2013	Kate Walsh, Steve Harvey
1,633	109	February 25, 2013	Felicity Huffman
1,634	110	February 26, 2013	Randy Jackson, Cameron Mathison
1,635	111	February 27, 2013	Colin Farrell, Steve Spangler
1,636	112	February 28, 2013	Zach Braff, Chris Mann
1,637	113	March 1, 2013	Mark Wahlberg, Sean "Diddy" Combs, Bonnie Raitt
1,638	114	March 4, 2013	Ellie Kemper, Rico Rodriguez
1,639	115	March 5, 2013	Salma Hayek, Kellan Lutz, Luke Bryan
1,640	116	March 6, 2013	Jessica Simpson, Jimmie Johnson
1,641	117	March 7, 2013	Howie Mandel, Dave Grohl
1,642	118	March 8, 2013	Steve Carell, Emily VanCamp
1,643	119	March 11, 2013	Jessica Alba, Scott Foley
1,644	120	April 2, 2013	Eva Mendes, John Mayer, Finding Dory Announcement
1,645	121	April 3, 2013	Bruno Mars, Ted Danson
1,646	122	April 4, 2013	Matthew Perry, Chris O'Dowd, Gin Wigmore
1,647	123	April 5, 2013	Kellie Pickler, Derek Hough Giuliana Rancic, Bill Rancic
1,648	124	April 8, 2013	Chris O'Donnell, Aubrey Plaza
1,649	125	April 9, 2013	Jerry O'Connell, Brad Paisley
1,650	126	April 10, 2013	Mario Lopez, Kacey Musgraves, Bethenny Frankel
1,651	127	April 11, 2013	Julia Louis-Dreyfus, The Band Perry
1,652	128	April 12, 2013	Heidi Klum, Michael Weatherly
1,653	129	April 15, 2013	Hilary Duff, D.L. Hughley, Cheryl Burke
1,654	130	April 16, 2013	Selena Gomez, Sophia Grace & Rosie
1,655	131	April 17, 2013	Adam Sandler, Chris Rock, Salma Hayek, Maya Rudolph, Kevin James, David Spade, Cee Lo Green
1,656	132	April 18, 2013	Jennifer Aniston, Bryce Dallas Howard, Brittany Snow
1,657	133	April 19, 2013	Matthew Perry(special co-host), Jennifer Love Hewitt, Ryan Lochte
1,658	134	April 22, 2013	Jane Lynch, Kenny Chesney
1,659	135	April 23, 2013	Diane Keaton, Jon Bon Jovi
1,660	136	April 24, 2013	Dennis Quaid, Kate McKinnon
1,661	137	April 25, 2013	Justin Timberlake
1,662	138	April 26, 2013	Gwyneth Paltrow, will.i.am
1,663	139	April 29, 2013	Vince Vaughn, Sophia Grace & Rosie
1,664	140	April 30, 2013	LL Cool J, Mario Lopez
1,665	141	May 1, 2013	Cher, Georgia Pelham, Theresa Caputo
1,666	142	May 2, 2013	Alison Sweeney, Michael Bublé
1,667	143	May 3, 2013	Ellen Pompeo, Nicole Richie
1,668	144	May 6, 2013	Matt Lauer, Sophia Grace & Rosie
1,669	145	May 7, 2013	Lauren Graham, Lady Antebellum
1,670	146	May 8, 2013	Harry Connick Jr., Kai Langer
1,671	147	May 9, 2013	Neil Patrick Harris, Beth Behrs
1,672	148	May 10, 2013 (Mother's Day Show)	Shakira, Bethenny Frankel
1,673	149	May 13, 2013	Kerry Washington, Demi Lovato
1,674	150	May 14, 2013	Kaley Cuoco, Keith Urban, Natalie Maines
1,675	151	May 15, 2013	Will Smith, Jaden Smith
1,676	152	May 16, 2013	Chris Pine, Robin Thicke
1,677	153	May 17, 2013	Rob Lowe, Alex O'Loughlin
1,678	154	May 20, 2013	Ed Helms, Ellen Here's My Talent Winner
1,679	155	May 21, 2013	Hayden Panettiere, Ed Sheeran
1,680	156	May 22, 2013	Jennifer Aniston (special co-host), Portia de Rossi, Lauren Graham, Howie Mandel, Kevin Nealon, Matthew Perry, Courteney Cox, Carrot Top, John Aniston
1,681	157	May 23, 2013	Amanda Seyfried, Kevin Nealon, Michael Bolton, Delta Goodrem
1,682	158	May 24, 2013	Steve Harvey, Neal D. Barnard, Grizzly Bear
1,683	159	May 27, 2013	Cat Deeley, Mike O'Malley, Ryan Wang
1,684	160	May 28, 2013	Tyler Perry, Ludacris, Matt Kemp
1,685	161	May 29, 2013	Howie Mandel, Usher, Ariana Grande, Mac Miller
1,686	162	May 30, 2013	Steve Carell, Stephen "tWitch" Boss, Allison Holker, Courtney Galiano
1,687	163	May 31, 2013	Wanda Sykes, Dave Franco
1,688	164	June 3, 2013	Kristen Bell, Joe Manganiello, OneRepublic
1,689	165	June 4, 2013	Amy Adams, Olivia Munn, Cyrus "Glitch" Spencer
1,690	166	June 5, 2013	Owen Wilson, Bridgit Mendler
1,691	167	June 10, 2013	Wendy Williams, Keaton Simons
1,692	168	June 11, 2013	Martin Short, Bethenny Frankel, Mario Lopez, Darius Rucker
Special	Special	June 12, 2013	Ellen in Sydney: Russell Crowe
Special	Special	June 13, 2013	Ellen in Melbourne: Jessica Mauboy, Dan Babic
