= Flamingo Estate =

American lifestyle and wellness brand

Flamingo Estate is an American lifestyle and wellness brand based in Los Angeles.

== History ==
Flamingo Estate operates from and is named for Richard Christiansen's 7-acre estate in the Los Angeles hills. Christiansen, a former advertising agency owner, bought the estate in 2013; he started the company in 2020, selling boxes of local produce to friends during the COVID-19 pandemic shut-down to help farmers survive; candles and soap were soon added. His partner, Aaron Harvey, is the creative director.

The company has expanded to offer a range of lifestyle and wellness products, including a wine, special offerings of bags of manure (labeled Good Shit) and of honey from bees kept in named celebrities' gardens, and a set of four soaps made from oil blessed by the Dalai Lama, proceeds from which were donated to his foundation. The brand is nature-based, with bags bearing the slogan "Mother Nature is the last great luxury house."

According to Christiansen, Flamingo Estate had sales of almost $10 million in 2022 and completed a first fundraising round in 2024. In summer 2023 and 2024, it had a pop-up store in the Hamptons in partnership with luxury brand Mytheresa. In 2024 it launched a collaboration with Marriott International, including a line of toiletries under the brand name Expansion. Flamingo Estate has become popular with Southern California celebrities, including Meghan Markle, whose American Riviera Orchard brand has been rumored to be inspired by it.

== Books ==
A Flamingo Estate cookbook, Fridays from the Garden, was published in 2023. In 2024 Christiansen published Flamingo Estate: The Guide to Becoming Alive, based on interviews with seventeen "thought leaders".
