= Kym Douglas =

Former American television personality

Kymberly Douglas (née Bankier; 1959) is an American television personality, actress, and blogger. She is best known for her guest starring roles in L. A. Law (1991), In Living Color (1993), Retired at 35 (2011), The Bold and the Beautiful (2017), and The Young and the Restless (2023). From 1985 until his death in 2021, she was married to The Young and the Restless actor Jerry Douglas. As a blogger, she was quoted as a beauty and lifestyle expert by several publications and is open about her struggles with breast cancer.
