= The Ellen DeGeneres Show season 14 =

Season of television series

The Ellen DeGeneres Show
- Season 14
- Starring: Ellen DeGeneres
- No. of episodes: 171 + 3 specials

Release
- Original release: September 6, 2016 – June 9, 2017

Season chronology
- ← Previous; Season 13 Next → Season 15

This is a list of episodes of the fourteenth season of The Ellen DeGeneres Show, which began airing from Tuesday, September 6, 2016.

== Episodes ==
No. overall	No. in season	Original release date	Guests
2,208	1	September 6, 2016	Channing Tatum, Simone Biles
Magic Michelle with Olivia Munn, Jenna Dewan Tatum, and Chrissy Teigen; Oprah Winfrey makes a surprise appearance; Positive Political ads; Magic Mike Live Dancers Perform
2,209	2	September 7, 2016	LeBron James, Aly Raisman
Ashley, Caila, and Jared from Bachelor in Paradise; Bachelor in Burbank; Ultimate Waste Basket with LeBron James; Ellen and Britney Spears go shopping at the Westfield Fashion Square mall; Aly Raisman and her parents get scared
2,210	3	September 8, 2016	Eddie Murphy, Alessia Cara
Kerry Washington makes a surprise appearance; Orlando shooting survivor Tony Marrero; Katy Perry surprises Tony Marrero; Alessia Cara performed "Scars to Your Beautiful"
2,211	4	September 9, 2016	Tom Hanks
Violet Ogea ABCs sensation; Ellen and Tom Hanks Have a Pixar-Off!; "Time Travel Earthquake" Starring Ellen DeGeneres and Tom Hanks; Ellen and Britney Spears Help Louisiana; Louisiana Relief Donation
2,212	5	September 12, 2016	Céline Dion, Ryan Lochte, Cheryl Burke
Explaining the Emoji Exploji; Céline Dion raps; Ryan Lochte's lost Ellen's underwear audition; Céline Dion performed "Recovering"
2,213	6	September 13, 2016	Michelle Obama(special co-host), Stephen Curry, Usher
Ellen and Michelle Obama go to CVS (Part 1); Barack Obama dancing compilation; Marian Shields Robinson is in the audience; "Oops! My Water Broke" with Michelle Obama and Stephen Curry; Usher performed "Crash"; Bradley Cooper makes a surprise appearance
2,214	7	September 14, 2016	Ariana Grande, Katie Ledecky
Ellen and Michelle Obama go to CVS (Part 2); American Ninja Warrior's Grant McCartney; Double Down Casino: "Ellen's Dance Party"; Ariana Grande performed a medley of "Into You" and "Side to Side"; Shamayim "Mama Shu" Harris; "Foot Flickers" with Grant McCartney and Katie Ledecky
2,215	8	September 15, 2016	Jimmy Kimmel, Scott Eastwood, Chance the Rapper, Lil Wayne, 2 Chainz
Bad Apps; New iPhone features; "Hot Hands" with Jimmy Kimmel; "Who'd You Rather? Live!" with Jimmy Kimmel and Scott Eastwood; Chance the Rapper, Lil Wayne & 2 Chainz performed "No Problem"
2,216	9	September 16, 2016	Seth Rogen, Carrie Underwood
Kevin the Cashier (played by Adam) at Costco; "You Must Say" with Seth Rogen and Carrie Underwood; "Pitch, Please" with Seth Rogen; Ellen scares Carrie Underwood; Carrie Underwood performed "Dirty Laundry"; Spain Elementary-Middle School get a new gym and a surprise from Matthew Stafford and Golden Tate
2,217	10	September 19, 2016	Viola Davis, Damon Wayans
Oh Ship! I Won a Cruise!; "Come On Dammit!"; Andy at the 68th Primetime Emmy Awards red carpet; 7-Year-Old Rapper Young Dylan; 5 Second Rule with Damon Wayans
2,218	11	September 20, 2016	Kristen Bell(special co-host), Michael Phelps, John Oliver
Shiney Hiney product; Dory Meets Princess Anna; Beauty Mask Removal Viral Star; "Foot Flickers" with Michael Phelps, John Oliver, and Kristen Bell; Ellen and Kristen Bell's Spice Girls audition
2,219	12	September 21, 2016	Lupita Nyong'o, Grace VanderWaal, Tim Kaine, The Head and the Heart
Fashion Week new looks; Kristen Bell's Shiney Hiney commercial; Grace VanderWaal performed "I Don't Know My Name"; The Head and the Heart performed "All We Ever Knew"; Tyler Oakley appears to make an announcement;
2,220	13	September 22, 2016	Kate Hudson
Ellen asks questions to the audience; Shiney Hiney reviews; Ellen and Kate Hudson Snapchat in bed together; Hollywood Medium Tyler Henry reading with Portia de Rossi; Louisiana Sisters
2,221	14	September 23, 2016	Gwen Stefani, Tig Notaro, Calum Scott
Shiney Hiney actress Sarah Pribis; 6-Year-Old Chef Kicha Cooks with Ellen; Calum Scott performed "Dancing On My Own"; Ellen's 'Grand Design' (John Colaneri & Anthony Carrino) Announcement!
2,222	15	September 26, 2016	Lea Michele, Bill O'Reilly, X Ambassadors
Cat Week, Day 1; Homecoming King's Act of Kindness; X Ambassadors performed "Unsteady; "Who'd You Rather?" with Lea Michele
2,223	16	September 27, 2016	Allison Janney, Usain Bolt, Kellie Pickler, Shawn Mendes
Cat Week, Day 2; "You Think You're Smarter Than Me?" with Allison Janney; Shawn Mendes performed "Treat You Better"; Ellen scares Kellie Pickler
2,224	17	September 28, 2016	Luke Bryan, Kylie Bunbury
Cat Week, Day 3; "Average Andy" with Michael Phelps; A Heart Transplant Recipient; "Oops! My Water Broke" with Luke Bryan; Luke Bryan performed "Move"; "Fantastic Beasts and Where to Find Them" Exclusive Trailer
2,225	18	September 29, 2016	Miley Cyrus(special host), Sarah Jessica Parker, Idina Menzel
Miley Cyrus hosted the episode due to Ellen's illness; Cat Week, Day 4; Whispering Voices; 5 Second Rule with Sarah Jessica Parker; A Random Act of Kindness Leads to a Surprise Meeting; Idina Menzel performed "Queen of Swords"
2,226	19	September 30, 2016	LL Cool J, John Turturro
Cat Week, Day 5; Ellen Takes a Look Back at Cat Week; An Amazing Surprise for a Loving Mother and Daughter; "What Ladies Love!" with LL Cool J; America's Got Talent finalist Sofie Dossi
2,227	20	October 3, 2016	Sean Combs, Stevie Nicks, Milo Ventimiglia
Millennials vs. Gen-X Quiz-off; White Men can Dance With tWitch; Me Me Monday; 5 Second Rule with Sean Combs; Stevie Nicks performed "Edge of Seventeen"; Splash Tank with Milo Ventimiglia
2,228	21	October 4, 2016	Kelly Clarkson, Chrissy Teigen
Ellen Store's Live Sale!; Ellen Meets the School Bus Driver Who Saved 20 Kids' Lives; "Celebrity Confessions" with Kelly Clarkson; JUMP Dance Convention Dancers perform
2,229	22	October 5, 2016	Taylor Lautner, Tatyana McFadden, Bon Jovi
Coincidence, I Think Not!; "Oops! My Water Broke" with Taylor Lautner; Bon Jovi announces his new tour; Bon Jovi performed "This House Is Not for Sale"; Running Man Challenge Duo at the iHeartRadio Music Festival
2,230	23	October 6, 2016	Christian Slater
Explainy the Emoji Exploji; "Average Andy" with Simone Biles; "Foot Flickers" with Christian Slater; America's Got Talent Runner-Ups, The Clairvoyants' Mind-Boggling Performance; Viral Yankees Game Proposal Couple
2,231	24	October 7, 2016	Kat Dennings, Morris Chestnut, OneRepublic
"What's the Diff?" (Coachella vs. Old-Chella); A Special Preview of the Second Presidential Debate; "Pretty Little Liars" (not the TV show); "Celebrity Shuffleboard" (Kat Dennings & Morris Chestnut vs. Ellen DeGeneres & Ryan Tedder); OneRepublic performed "Kids"; Ellen's Biggest Fan Gets an Amazing Surprise
2,232	25	October 10, 2016	Hilary Duff, Laurie Hernandez, Val Chmerkovskiy, Anderson .Paak
Audience Dating App Profiles; Mark Harmon Week (appearance by Courtney Thorne-Smith); A Teacher's Lifesaving Act of Kindness (message from Aaron Rodgers); Anderson .Paak & The Free Nationals performed "Come Down"; Dave Franco's message to Laurie Hernandez; Explainy the Emoji Exploji
2,233	26	October 11, 2016	Kevin Hart(special co-host), Khloé Kardashian
Audience Questions from Ken Bone; Mark Harmon Week; "Speak Out" with Khloé Kardashian; An Incredible College Student Gets an Amazing Surprise; 5 Second Rule with Kevin Hart
2,234	27	October 12, 2016	Taye Diggs, Sarah Hyland, Bastille
Mark Harmon Week; Rejected emojis; Samsung Galaxy problems; "Does Taye Diggs It?" with Taye Diggs; Sarah Hyland gets scared; Five-Year-Old Violet Meets a Sloth; Batille performed "Good Grief"; "Come On Dammit!"
2,235	28	October 13, 2016	Colin Farrell, Laverne Cox, John Legend
Mark Harmon Week; One Man's Journey to a Healthier Life; John Legend performed "Love Me Now"
2,236	29	October 14, 2016	Hillary Clinton, Bryan Cranston
What Makes America Great; Mark Harmon Week (appearance by Mark Harmon); Make It Rain!; Stuff Your Cups with Bryan Cranston
2,237	30	October 17, 2016	Wanda Sykes, Steve Spangler, The Band Perry
Best Moments with Andy Lassner; Me Me Monday; Clumsy Thumbsy; Giant Game of Bejeweled Stars; The Band Perry performed "Comeback Kid; 4-Year-Old 'Juju on That Beat' Dancer; Steve Spangler's science
2,238	31	October 18, 2016	Shia LaBeouf, Jesse Williams, Troye Sivan
Why I Don't Have Kids; Troye Sivan performed "Heaven"; Magic from Jon Dorenbos
2,239	32	October 19, 2016	Tyler Perry, Lewis Hamilton, Maren Morris
Yum! or Yuck!; Tyler Perryoake; Maren Morris performed "80s Mercedes"; Britton's Magical Adventure with David Copperfield
2,240	33	October 20, 2016	Rachel McAdams, Justin Hartley
Emoji Exploji Charades-Oji!; Sellin' Ellen Submissions; "Oops! My Water Broke" with Rachel McAdams and Justin Hartley; Ellen's Surprise for Wonderful New Dads; Kym Douglas' Fall Beauty Tips
2,241	34	October 21, 2016	Robin Roberts, Garth Brooks
Know or Go; "Average Andy" with Magic Mike Live Dancers; Garth Brooks performed "Baby, Let's Lay Down and Dance"; Ace for the Cure! with Robin Roberts
2,242	35	October 24, 2016	Zooey Deschanel
Wells Fargo Apology; "Pretty Little Liars" (not the TV show); Ulta Beauty Donation to The Breast Cancer Research Foundation; A Blind and Deaf Teen Who's Defying the Odds; "Speak Out" with Zooey Deschanel; James Hinchcliffe and Sharna Burgess dance; Make It Rain!;
2,243	36	October 25, 2016	Vince Vaughn, Priyanka Chopra, Joseph
Goldman & Mangold Office Ad; Ellen's World Series Prediction; 5 Second Rule with Vince Vaughn; Joseph performed "White Flag"; 5th-Graders Behind the Viral List of Rules; Ellen gives out 12 Days of Giveaways tickets
2,244	37	October 26, 2016	Anna Kendrick, Martha Stewart, Snoop Dogg, Donald Glover, Niall Horan
"Andybelle"; Ellen's Halloween Costume Ideas from 2nd-Graders; Never Have I Ever with Martha Stewart, Snoop Dogg and Anna Kendrick; Niall Horan performed "This Town"; "Who'd You Rather?" with Niall Horan
2,245	38	October 27, 2016	Miley Cyrus
Ellen's Kid Costume Ideas; New "Alexa"; Winnie the Pooh's 90th Birthday; Parenting Hacks; "Haunted Hot Hands"; Lyric & Melody Hurd Break It Down; Andy and Jacqueline's Haunted House Visit
2,246	39	October 28, 2016	Ricky Gervais, Kenny Chesney
Ellen's Best Halloween Moments; Ellen scares Ricky Gervais; Kenny Chesney performed Noise; Ellen's Home Run Surprise for World Series Fans; Presidential Expert Macey Hensley; Macey Visits a Country Music Festival (surprise from Kenny Chesney)
2,247	40	October 31, 2016	Heidi Klum, Beth Behrs
Ellen's Halloween Show Ellen's Sia costume; Heidi Klum dances dressed as Maddie Ziegler; Audience Costumes (appearance by Chris Martin); Ellen's Backstage Mirror Scares; Halloween in Dance; Zay and Zayion performed "Juju on that Beat; Slime Face with Heidi Klum and Beth Behrs; Andy and Ariana Grande Go to a Haunted House
2,248	41	November 1, 2016	Jake Gyllenhaal, Ronda Rousey
Ellen's Snap-Cap; Make Jake with Jake Gyllenhaal; Naked Peruvian Chef Franco Noriega cooks with Ellen; A Woman Dances Her Way Through Cancer
2,249	42	November 2, 2016	Eddie Redmayne, James More
What's In the Box?; Obama's Taco Tuesday; Exclusive CMAs Promo; Don't Do It Yourself; Live Commercial for Campbell's Soup; "Heads Up" with Eddie Redmayne; A Memorable Audience Member Returns for More Surprises; Magic from James Moore
2,250	43	November 3, 2016	Adam Levine, Julianne Moore, Maroon 5
Ellen and Adam Levine's Bathroom Scares; Pole dancing fails; A Brooklyn Basketball Coach Who's Changing Lives (message from Brook Lopez); Ellen and Julianne Moore use Snapchat; "You Must Say" with Adam Levine and Julianne Moore; Maroon 5 performed "Don't Wanna Know"
2,251	44	November 4, 2016	Justin Timberlake, Gabrielle Union
Ellen tries bottle flipping; Introducing Ellen's Skybox; Why I Don't Have Kids; 7-Year-Old Rapper Young Dylan; 5 Second Rule with Justin Timberlake & Mario Lopez; Leonardo DiCaprio makes a surprise appearance to talk about his documentary
2,252	45	November 7, 2016	Jessica Alba, Elizabeth Warren
Me Me Monday; Celebrity Emojis; Sellin' Ellen Submissions; Best Celebrity Game Moments; Jessica Alba and Ellen's Hair-Raising Good Time; Brielle
2,253	46	November 8, 2016	Warren Beatty, Mandy Moore, Kris Bryant, David Ross
Exclusive! A Look Inside the Obamas' Private Residence; New Emojis for Emoji Exploji; Rapid Fire with Warren Beatty; A Cubs Fan Gets a Deep Dish Surprise
2,254	47	November 9, 2016	Julie Bowen
Ellen discusses the election; Ellen's 12 Days Skybox Challenge; Memorable Election Moments; Make It Rain Cash Money with Julie Bowen; Viral Rap Star Siblings
2,255	48	November 10, 2016	Jennifer Lawrence, Chris Pratt
"Strange Doctor" with Justin Timberlake; Ellen and Justin Timberlake's Backstage Ping Pong Battle; Don't Do It Yourself; Epic or Fail; 5 Second Rule with Jennifer Lawrence and Chris Pratt; Macey on the Country Music Awards Red Carpet
2,256	49	November 11, 2016	Kristen Stewart, Lin-Manuel Miranda, Brad Paisley
Lin-Manuel Miranda Busts Out Rhymes with Ellen; Heartwarming Veterans and Pets Reunions; Bermuda Triangle Mystery Solved; Andy Zenor on a Carnival Cruise with Carrie Underwood and Deshauna Barber; "Double Money Hot Hands"; Claw Game with Lin-Manuel Miranda; Brad Paisley performed "Today"
2,257	50	November 14, 2016	Diane Keaton, James Charles; David Blaine
Really Strange Reality Shows; First Male CoverGirl James Charles Meets Ellen; David Blaine Magic Tricks
2,258	51	November 15, 2016	Dwayne Johnson, Michelle Williams, Jon Dorenbos
Kids Getting Stuck in Things; Good Help is Hard to Find; Blindfolded Musical Chairs Live from Herald Square; Dwayne Johnson is People Magazine's Sexiest Man Alive; Magic from Jon Dorenbos
2,259	52	November 16, 2016	Kendall Jenner, Ricky Martin
Exceptional 12 Days of Giveaways Excitement; Coincidence, I Think Not!; Ellen in Blac Chynas Mannequin Challenge; A Live Commercial for Ring Video Doorbell; Cash at Your Door in New York; "Hot Hands: Kardashians Edition with Kendall Jenner; Ricky Martin performed a medley of "Mr. Put It Down", "Shake Your Bon-Bon", "La Mordidita", and "Livin' la Vida Loca"; Ricky Martin announced his Vegas Residency
2,260	53	November 17, 2016	Rob Lowe
Ellen's Mannequin Challenge; Yum! or Yuck!; To Floss or Not To Floss; Ellen's Favorite Audience Games; Ellen and Rob Lowe Play Doctor; Four-Year-Old Dancer Tavaris; High or Low 5ive;
2,261	54	November 18, 2016	Serena Williams
Submissions for Ellen's 12 Days Skybox Challenge; Vince Vaughn Talks to Kids; "Who'd You Rather?" with Serena Williams; Ellen's Most Favorite Moments; A South Central School Gets an Incredible Surprise
2,262	55	November 21, 2016 (Day 1 of 12 Days of Giveaways)	Emma Stone
Day 1 Giveaways; A Fan's GEICO Skybox Surprise; "Last Dance" with Emma Stone; "Average Andy" with Tom Daley; "The Game of Things" with Martha Stewart, Snoop Dogg and Miley Cyrus
2,263	56	November 22, 2016 (Day 2 of 12 Days of Giveaways)	Lauren Graham, Sting
"Hole in One"; Wolf Blitzer Is Your Go-To Mobile Moderator; Ellen's Skybox Skype Surprise; 5 Second Rule with Lauren Graham; Sting performed "I Can't Stop Thinking About You"; Day 2 Giveaways
2,264	57	November 23, 2016 (Day 3 of 12 Days of Giveaways)	Mariah Carey, Leah Remini
Millennials vs. Gen-X Quiz-off; "Average Andy" with Steven López; Day 3 Giveaways; "Who'd You Rather?" with Mariah Carey; Leah Remini's Test Kitchen Pie
2,265	58	November 28, 2016 (Day 4 of 12 Days of Giveaways)	Helen Mirren, James Marsden, The Weeknd
Helen Mirren joins the monologue; Day 4 Giveaways; Ellie Kemper wrapping gifts at the mall; "Heads Up" with Helen Mirren; The Weeknd performed "Starboy"
2,266	59	November 29, 2016 (Day 5 of 12 Days of Giveaways)	Carrie Fisher, Tracee Ellis Ross, The Revivalists
Ellen shows her Presidential Medal of Freedom; Ellen's Mannequin Challenge at the White House; Submissions for Ellen's 12 Days Skybox Challenge; The Revivalists performed "Wish I Knew You"; "Carrie Fishing for Answers" with Carrie Fisher; Day 5 Giveaways
2,267	60	November 30, 2016 (Day 6 of 12 Days of Giveaways)	Jennifer Aniston, Derek Hough
Ellen's Influential Image; "Sumo Charades" with Jennifer Aniston; Never Have I Ever with Jennifer Aniston; Day 6 Giveaways with Jennifer Aniston; Amazing Surprise for Ellen's GEICO Skybox Challenge Winners
2,268	61	December 1, 2016 (Day 7 of 12 Days of Giveaways)	T.J. Miller, Chrissy Metz, Kane Brown
Really Fake News; Planet Earth II behind the scenes; Parenting Gone Dad; Kane Brown performed "Thunder In the Rain"; T.J. Miller juggles; Day 7 Giveaways with T.J. Miller
2,269	62	December 2, 2016 (Day 8 of 12 Days of Giveaways)	Blake Shelton, Diego Luna
Submissions for Ellen's 12 Days Skybox Challenge; "Wet Head" with Blake Shelton; Day 8 Giveaways with Blake Shelton; A Wonderful Surprise for an Adorable Couple
2,270	63	December 5, 2016 (Day 9 of 12 Days of Giveaways)	Justin Bieber, Felicity Jones
Epic or Fail; Ellen in Justin Bieber's Mistletoe music video; Justin Bieber performed an acoustic version of "Cold Water"; Day 9 Giveaways; Explainy the Emoji Exploji with Candace Cameron-Bure, Jodie Sweetin and Andrea Barber
2,271	64	December 6, 2016 (Day 10 of 12 Days of Giveaways)	Milo Ventimiglia
Products for Men; Celebrity Baby Look-Alikes; Breaking News Special Reports; "Average Andy" with The Rockettes; Ellen and Milo Ventimiglia do Partner Push-ups; "Heads Up" with Milo Ventimiglia; Make It Rain!; Day 10 Giveaways
2,272	65	December 7, 2016 (Day 11 of 12 Days of Giveaways)	Natalie Portman, Miranda Lambert
Dash by Dasher; Walt Disney Presents "Mickey Mouse's 88th Birthday; Submissions for Ellen's 12 Days Skybox Challenge; Best Friends Brian and Jackson (appearance by Drew Brees and Brittany Brees); Day 11 Giveaways; Miranda Lambert performed "Vice"; "Hot Hands"
2,273	66	December 8, 2016 (Day 12 of 12 Days of Giveaways)	Will Smith, OneRepublic
Submissions for Ellen's 12 Days Skybox Challenge; Ellen surprises college students in Wisconsin; Will Smith takes selfies with the audience; OneRepublic performed "Let's Hurt Tonight"; Day 12 Giveaways
2,274	67	December 9, 2016 (Bonus Day Of 12 Days of Giveaways)	Ryan Gosling, Olivia Munn, Macklemore
Ellen's "Wheel of Riches"; Bonus Day of Giveaways; The Melisizwe Brothers performed "I'll Be There"; Macklemore performed "Wednesday Morning"
2,275	68	December 12, 2016	Matthew Perry, Amy Schumer
Surprise Bonus Day of Giveaways; Audience Members Dancing; "Friend or Foe"; Ellen Catches Up with an Incredible South Central School
2,276	69	December 13, 2016	Reese Witherspoon, Joshua Jackson, Green Day
FurReal Friends Toy; Airline Industry New Ad; Ellen Staff Gets Scared; Green Day performed "American Idiot" and "Still Breathing"; Another Bonus Day of Giveaways
2,277	70	December 14, 2016	Matthew McConaughey, Kings of Leon
Dear Santa Letters From Kids; "Fifty Shades Darker" Ellen Underwear; Ellen Investigation of People who Sold Their 12 Days Gifts; Kings of Leon performed "Reverend"; Nicole Kidman makes a surprise appearance; What's In the Box?/Bonus Day of Giveaways
2,278	71	December 15, 2016	Alicia Keys, Rosemarie DeWitt
Ellen's Slumber Party Challenge; Kid Gift Reactions; Kevin the Cashier (played by Adam) at Christmas Tree Lot; Ellen's Sweet Surprise for a Mother and Daughter; Alicia Keys performed "Blended Family"; Bonus Day of Giveaways
2,279	72	December 16, 2016	Jim Parsons, Cass McCombs
This Holiday in Dance; Ellen's Best of 2016; 5 Second Rule with Jim Parsons; Ellen and Andy Feel the Need for Speed at the Porsche Experience Center; Cass McCombs performed "Bum Bum Bum"; Ellen Meets an Unforgettable Kid Surfer
2,280	73	January 3, 2017	Ted Danson, Kaitlin Olson, Shawn Mendes
Ellen's Favorite Moments of 2016; Audience Members Singing; People Playing "Heads Up"; Space Expert Brielle; Pitch, Please with Kaitlin Olson; Shawn Mendes performed "Mercy"
2,281	74	January 4, 2017	Jamie Foxx, Connie Britton
Audience Members' New Year's Resolutions; "Su'Move It, Move It" with Jamie Foxx; Ellen Meets Two Inspiring Blind Brothers; Ellen's tribute to Carrie Fisher
2,282	75	January 5, 2017	Jimmy Fallon, Janelle Monáe, Pharrell Williams
Ellen's Car Wash Adventure; Animals Be Smart, Humans Be Stoopid; "Speak Out" with Jimmy Fallon; Pharrell Williams performed "Runnin"
2,283	76	January 6, 2017	Mark Wahlberg, Dev Patel, Lukas Graham
Note: This episode was interrupted in most areas due to the Fort Lauderdale airport shooting
2,284	77	January 9, 2017	Jessica Biel, Millie Bobby Brown
Know or Go: Happy New Year; Ellen's Hatchimal Live Cam; Amazon Alexa Videos; It's a Jungle in the Amazon; Ellen and Jessica Biel call Justin Timberlake; 7-Year-Old Rapper Young Dylan meets Drake
2,285	78	January 10, 2017	Ben Affleck, Ruby Rose
Ellen in Speed; Travis Wall and the Cast of Shaping Sound performed; Make It Rain!; 5 Second Rule with Ben Affleck; Ellen teaches Oscar the Grouch About Kindness;
2,286	79	January 11, 2017	Octavia Spencer, Billy Eichner
Switch a tWitch with Kathy; Kid Elvis Tribute Artist Performed; Ellen's "Wheel of Riches" with Octavia Spencer; Ellen shows a clip with Mark Wahlberg from January 6 show that was interrupted due to the Fort Lauderdale airport shooting
2,287	80	January 12, 2017	Howie Mandel, Laurie Hernandez
Different Gifts; "The Car Wash" with Ellen DeGeneres; Show Did/Show Didn't; Ice-T and Mariska Hargitay have a message for Laurie Hernandez; Ellen Investigation of People who Sold Their 12 Days Gifts; Ellen Surprises Incredible Teacher Mr. Bonner
2,288	81	January 13, 2017	Adam DeVine, Chris Harrison
This + That; "Know the Emoji"; Flip Cup Frenzy; Pie Face with Adam DeVine and His Mom; 2-Year-Old Bottle Flipper
2,289	82	January 16, 2017	Nick Cannon, Rae Sremmurd
We The People's Choice Awards; Bachelor Red Flags; Planet Earth II: Burbank; Rae Sremmurd performed "Black Beatles"; Make It Rain; Ellen shows a clip of a Surprise for NYC Sisters from January 6 show that was interrupted due to the Fort Lauderdale airport shooting
2,290	83	January 17, 2017	Kerry Washington, Corey Hawkins
Ellen calls Pink; "Heads Up": Chinese New Year Edition; "Speak Out" with Kerry Washington; Most Amazing Ski Lift Rescue Ever
2,291	84	January 18, 2017	Matt LeBlanc, Deepika Padukone
This Side vs. That Side; La La Land Starring Ellen DeGeneres; Ellen's Hiney Helper; Mom of Quadruplets Talks Her Viral 'Mommy Break'
2,292	85	January 19, 2017	Tony Goldwyn
Ellen's Books; Ellen's Presidential Appearance; Ellen Sets a People's Choice Awards Record; Ellen's Tribute to the Obamas; Ellen Surprises a Sweet Single Mother and Daughter; "Speak Out" with Tony Goldwyn; A Singing Dad Whose Went Viral; Kris Jones performed "Tennessee Whiskey"
2,293	86	January 20, 2017	Annette Bening, Ken Jeong, Old Dominion
Note: This episode was interrupted due to the Inauguration of Donald Trump
2,294	87	January 23, 2017	Dennis Quaid, Katie Couric, James Taylor-Watts
Me Me Monday; Hatchimal Live Cam with Ben Affleck; Go with GEICO; James Taylor-Watts performed "When You Love Someone"
2,295	88	January 24, 2017	Aaron Paul, Lady Antebellum
Announcing Ellen's Super Bowl Challenge; Alcohol Brewing Machine Commercial; Ellen Meets a 6-Year-Old Science Podcaster; Lady Antebellum performed "You Look Good; "Oops! My Water Broke" with Lady Antebellum; A Mother-Daughter Duo's Dream Comes True; Big LGBT Thank You to President Obama
2,296	89	January 25, 2017	Ed O'Neill, Maura Tierney
Ellen's Oscar Nominee Summary; A Live Commercial for TurboTax; Dancing Farmer Jay; A "Finding Dory" R=Rated Deleted Scene; "Cash for Kindness" at the Grauman's Chinese Theatre
2,297	90	January 26, 2017 (Ellen's Birthday Show)	Kristen Bell, Dax Shepard, Tig Notaro, Anderson .Paak
Ellen scares her staff; Audience Members' Celebrations with Tig Notaro; tWitch's Top-Notch Birthday Surprise for Ellen; Stand up from Tig Notaro; Ellen's Brilliant Birthday Gifts for the Audience with Kristen Bell and Dax Shepard; Anderson .Paak performed "Am I Wrong"; "Us vs. Them" (Ellen DeGeners & Tig Notaro Vs. Kristen Bell & Dax Shepard); Portia de Rossi makes an appearance.
2,298	91	January 27, 2017	Beth Behrs, The Growlers
Parenting Hacks, and a Big Break for Mom; "Average Andy" with Los Angeles Kings; "Hot Hands" with Beth Behrs; The Growlers performed "I'll Be Around"; Lifechanging Surprise for Iraqi Soldiers
2,299	92	January 30, 2017	Mario Lopez, Timothy Olyphant, Camila Cabello, Machine Gun Kelly
Know or Go (Sit In the Idiot Section); 7-Year-Old Recycler Who's Saving the World; Camila Cabello & Machine Gun Kelly performed "Bad Things"; "Last Dance" with Mario Lopez
2,300	93	January 31, 2017	Jamie Dornan, Drew Brees, Big Sean
Ellen Comments on the Travel Ban; Portia's Birthday; Backward Day; Andy's Porsche Commercial; Coincidence, I Think Not!; "Balless"; Fifty Shades Darkest Starring Ellen DeGeneres & Jamie Dornan Big Sean performed "Moves"; Drew Brees Throws Footballs For His Charity
2,301	94	February 1, 2017	Wanda Sykes
Kathy Speaks the Lyrics; A Lifesaving Rescue from a Burning Car; "Dice with Ellen"; Corinne Olympios from "The Bachelor" Stops By; "Who'd You Rather?" with Corinne Olympios
2,302	95	February 2, 2017	Drew Barrymore
New United Airlines Ad For Low Fare Flyers; "Swipe Right" with Drew Barrymore; "Heads Up" with Drew Barrymore in Giant Royal Costumes; Ellen's Live Kitten Bowl Challenge at Georgia Tech; Singing Father-Daughter Duo performed "You've Got a Friend in Me"
2,303	96	February 3, 2017	Ice Cube
Fifty Shades Cleaner; Strippers in the Audience (Super Bowl Edition); Australian Kid Surfer Sabre Norris; "Foot Flickers" with Ice Cube; Cassandra and Melody's Extraordinary Surprise; Super Bowl Party Pie Face
2,304	97	February 6, 2017	Sofia Vergara
What's In the Box?; Audience Sing-along; Goldman & Mangold: Hatchimals; How Not To Do Things; Explainy the Emoji Exploji with Sofia Vergara; Andy Gets a Hair Makeover from Ellen and Sofía Vergara with Head & Shoulders; Dancing Siblings Perform and Get Their Minds Blown
2,305	98	February 7, 2017	Tracy Morgan, Vanessa Hudgens, Jon Dorenbos, Zara Larsson, Ty Dolla $ign
Twitter's Bootylicious New Critter; Ellen, Take Me Away; Ellen In the Honda Commercial; The Bachelor Clip of the Day; Andy and Jon Dorenbos at the Super Bowl; Zara Larsson & Ty Dolla $ign performed "So Good"; Magic from Jon Dorenbos
2,306	99	February 8, 2017	Jesse Tyler Ferguson, James Corden, Panic! at the Disco
Audience Dancing; Ellen and Channing Tatum's New Year's Resolutions; Why I Don't Have Kids; "Finish the Lyric" with James Corden & Jesse Tyler Ferguson; Panic! at the Disco performed "Death of a Bachelor"; Ellen's Beyonce Challenge at University of Texas
2,307	100	February 9, 2017	Nicole Kidman
Planet Earth II: Burbank; Girl Scouts' Honest Commercial; Space Expert Brielle; "Hot Hands"; A Spectacular School Gets an Extraordinary Surprise
2,308	101	February 10, 2017	Tim McGraw, Faith Hill, Gigi Hadid
Celebrity Couples Best Moments; A PSA for Redhead Emojis by Jesse Tyler Ferguson; What's Wrong With These Signs? Signs; Never Have I Ever with Tim McGraw & Faith Hill; "Grab My Thong and Finish the Song"; "Cash at Your Door" in California
2,309	102	February 13, 2017	Khloé Kardashian, Lin-Manuel Miranda
Kym Douglas' Spicy Valentine's Day Tips; Audience Sing-along; Badvertising; Kathy and Andy at the Grammys Red Carpet; Khloé Kardashian Works Out; Ellen Pays Off Your Debt; 5 Second Rule with Lin-Manuel Miranda
2,310	103	February 14, 2017	Nick Viall, Charlie Day, Ed Sheeran
The Bachelor Clip of the Day; Kid's Valentines; Kai Langer sang "Thinking Out Loud" with Ed Sheeran; Ed Sheeran performed "Shape of You"; Let's Make a Trade...to Pay Off Your Debt!
2,311	104	February 15, 2017	Adam Levine, Maroon 5
Baby Talk (FaceTime Edition); An Unbelievable Limbo Artist Shows Off Her Skills; Adam Levine Serenades a Song To Single People; Strippers in the Audience: Ellen Pays Off a Wedding Debt; Maroon 5 performed "Cold"
2,312	105	February 16, 2017	Matt Damon
Animal Products; Adorable Dog Videos; Ellen and Snoop Dogg Party; New Dating App; Epic or Fail; "The Great Wall of Balloons" with Matt Damon; Ellen Pays Off an Extraordinary Teacher's Debt; Kid Rapper Yung Hunnid
2,313	106	February 17, 2017	Kate Hudson
Random Acts Of Kindness; What's Wrong With These Photos? Photos; Make It Rain! (Paying Debt Off); Incredible Teacher Mr. Bonner; Class Song - "Read It" with Big Sean, Lin-Manuel Miranda, Ice Cube, Migos & Ty Dolla $ign
2,314	107	February 20, 2017	Kris Jenner, Migos
Know or Go with Presidential Expert Macey Hensley; Me Me Monday; This + That; New Whole Foods Ad; Just Kid Ink; Migos performed "Bad and Boujee"; Ellen and Macey's Best Moments
2,315	108	February 21, 2017	Jennifer Lopez
Ellen in Movies Montage; Instant Mood Booster; "Average Andy" with Yamamotoyama Ryūta; A Terrific Dancing Trio Performed; "Who'd You Rather?" with Jennifer Lopez; An Exceptional Fan's Jaw-Dropping Surprise
2,316	109	February 22, 2017	Demi Lovato
Kids In the Control Room; Inside Harrison Ford's Plane; Ellen's Russian Ties; Mar-a-Lago Commercial; A Terrific Teacher's Wonderful Surprise; "Lucky, Lucky, Shoot the Pucky"; "Su'Move It, Move It" with Demi Lovato; Young Dylan at the NBA All-Star Weekend with Stephen Curry
2,317	110	February 23, 2017	Jimmy Kimmel
Jack Erwin New Designs; Throwback Thursday; Road To Get To The Oscars; Jimmy Kimmel Gets Oscar-Ready with Ellen and Kym Douglas; Ellen Gives Her Single Biggest Gift Ever
2,318	111	February 24, 2017	Ryan Seacrest, Rachel Lindsay, John Mayer
Ellen Summarizes Oscar Nominated Movies; Ellen and tWitch's Real-Life La La Land; Instant Mood Booster; Snapchat Episode of Planet Earth II; Why I Don't Have Kids; "Hot Hands" with Ryan Seacrest; John Mayer performed "Moving On and Getting Over"; Ellen's Oscar Reenactments
2,319	112	February 27, 2017	Samuel L. Jackson
What's In the Box?: Oscars Edition; Staff Member Baby Announcement; Me Me Monday; Oscars Breaking News; Judy or Jackson with Samuel L. Jackson; Ellen's Favorite Audience Game Moments; A Teen Singer-Songwriter's Surprise with Ed Sheeran; Teen Busker Alfie Sheard performed "Wonderful Tonight"
2,320	113	February 28, 2017	David Spade
Make It Rain!; Instant Mood Booster; Looky Looky at This Booky; Ellen's Breast Moments; 5 Second Rule with David Spade; Singing Father-Daughter Duo performed "How Far I'll Go"; Ellen Catches Up with Orlando shooting survivor Tony Marrero
2,321	114	March 1, 2017	Scott Foley, Little Big Town
The Bachelor Clip of the Day; Big Surprise for New York City Fans; Scott Foley Auditions for His Dream Job; Five-Year-Old Tavaris; Little Big Town performed "Better Man"
2,322	115	March 2, 2017	George W. Bush, Lily Collins, Future
Dice with Ellen; Future performed "Incredible"
2,323	116	March 3, 2017	Emma Watson, Rascal Flatts
Eminem's Feathered Duet Partner; Kathy's Hidden Camera Pranks; Ellen Meets Table Tennis Champion Siblings; Ellen in Emma Watson's Ear; Rascal Flatts performed "Yours If You Want It"; You Bet Your Wife
2,324	117	March 13, 2017	Minnie Driver, Luke Evans, Noah Cyrus, Labrinth
2,325	118	March 14, 2017	Dax Shepard, Ryan Leaf, Rag'n'Bone Man
2,326	119	March 15, 2017	Mindy Kaling, Michael Peña
2,327	120	March 16, 2017	Felicity Huffman, Lea Michele
2,328	121	March 17, 2017	Kristen Bell, Dan Bucatinsky
2,329	122	March 20, 2017	Jane Fonda, Tori Kelly
2,330	123	March 21, 2017	Claire Danes
2,331	124	March 22, 2017	Lena Dunham
2,332	125	March 23, 2017	Ellen Pompeo
2,333	126	March 24, 2017	Melissa McCarthy, Ben Falcone, Rachel Ramras, Hugh Davidson
2,334	127	April 3, 2017	Chris Evans, Mckenna Grace, Drew Barrymore, Lewis Howes
2,335	128	April 4, 2017	Eric Stonestreet, Noah Ritter, Khalid
2,336	129	April 5, 2017	Zach Braff, Demi Lovato, Ed Sheeran
2,337	130	April 6, 2017	Anne Hathaway, Jason Sudeikis
2,338	131	April 7, 2017	Adam Sandler, Meghan Trainor
2,339	132	April 10, 2017	Justin Theroux Erika Jayne & Gleb Savchenko
2,340	133	April 11, 2017	Chelsea Handler, Ludacris
2,341	134	April 12, 2017	Charlize Theron, Jeff Garlin
2,342	135	April 13, 2017	Chris Hardwick, Kunal Nayyar, Ashley Benson, Lucy Hale, Sasha Pieterse, Shay Mitchell, Troian Bellisario
2,343	136	April 14, 2017	Rob Lowe, Edward Matthew Lowe, John Owen Lowe, Maddie Ziegler
2,344	137	April 17, 2017	Simone Biles, Sasha Farber, Reuben de Maid, John Mayer
2,345	138	April 18, 2017	Carson Daly, Rob Delaney, Spoon (band)
2,346	139	April 19, 2017	Magic Johnson, Nicole Richie, Travis Scott
2,347	140	April 20, 2017	Tracee Ellis Ross, David Ross, Lindsay Arnold, Warpaint
2,348	141	April 21, 2017	Jessica Lange, Channing Tatum, Gina Rodriguez
2,349	142	April 24, 2017	Jennifer Lopez, Sheryl Sandberg, Warpaint
2,350	143	April 25, 2017	Vin Diesel, Jenna Dewan Tatum, Mary J. Blige
2,351	144	April 26, 2017	Salma Hayek, Jennifer Hudson, Matthew Whitaker
2,352	145	April 27, 2017	Kim Kardashian West
Ellen Flies Her Biggest New York Fans to Los Angeles for a Trip of a Lifetime. Ellen Gives the Audience 12 Days of Giveaways Gifts
2,353	146	April 28, 2017	Oprah Winfrey, Laura Dern, Joely Fisher, Clea Lewis, David Anthony Higgins
Ellen Celebrates the 20th Anniversary of the Iconic Puppy Episode on Her Sitcom, Ellen
2,354	147	May 1, 2017	Ashton Kutcher, Katherine Langford, Dylan Minnette, Nate Seltzer
2,355	148	May 2, 2017	Wanda Sykes, Demarjay Smith
2,356	149	May 3, 2017	Alec Baldwin, Taylor Schilling
2,357	150	May 4, 2017	Matt Lauer. Macey Hensley
2,358	151	May 5, 2017	Bradley Cooper, Kym Douglas
2,359	152	May 8, 2017	Colin Farrell, Normani Kordei, Val Chmerkovskiy, Demarjay Smith
2,360	153	May 9, 2017	Nicole Kidman, Giada De Laurentiis
2,361	154	May 10, 2017	Julia Louis-Dreyfus. Tom Holland, Brielle Milla
2,362	155	May 11, 2017	Amy Schumer, Goldie Hawn
2,363	156	May 12, 2017	Chris Pratt
2,364	157	May 15, 2017	Will Ferrell. Amy Poehler, Mariska Hargitay
2,365	158	May 16, 2017	Katy Perry
2,366	159	May 17, 2017	Reese Witherspoon
2,367	160	May 18, 2017	Johnny Depp, Niall Horan
2,368	161	May 19, 2017	Julia Roberts, Richard Curtis
2,369	162	May 22, 2017	Jessica Simpson, Bianca Busa
2,370	163	May 23, 2017	Nicki Minaj. Robin Wright
2,371	164	May 24, 2017	Michael Keaton, Andy Cohen
2,372	165	May 25, 2017	Howie Mandel, Laurent Bourgeous, Larry Bourgeous
Funniest Moments of Season 14
2,373	166	May 26, 2017	Jon Dorenbos, Jamie Foxx, Sofía Vergara, Justin Timberlake
Two for Tuesday
Special	Special	May 30, 2017	Michelle Obama, Jennifer Lawrence, Chris Pratt, Britney Spears
Favorite Kids of Season 14
Special	Special	May 31, 2017	Noah Ritter, Macey Hensley, Dylan Gilmer, Brielle Milla
Biggest Stars of Season 14
Special	Special	June 1, 2017	Miley Cyrus, Kate Hudson, Drew Barrymore, Chelsea Handler, Jennifer Lopez
Inspiring Stories from Season 14
2,374	167	June 5, 2017	Josh Duhamel
2,375	168	June 6, 2017	Kerry Washington, Scott Speedman, Florida Georgia Line. Backstreet Boys
2,376	169	June 7, 2017	Mark Wahlberg, Judd Apatow, Daniel Fernandez
2,377	170	June 8, 2017	Owen Wilson, Curtis Stone, Sofie Dossi
2,378	171	June 9, 2017	Liev Schreiber, Brett Eldredge
