= The Ellen DeGeneres Show season 16 =

The Ellen DeGeneres Show
- Season 16
- Starring: Ellen DeGeneres
- No. of episodes: 189

Release
- Original release: September 4, 2018 – June 28, 2019

Season chronology
- ← Previous; Season 15 Next → Season 17

This is a list of episodes of the sixteenth season of The Ellen DeGeneres Show (often stylized as ellen16), which began airing on Tuesday, September 4, 2018.

== Episodes ==
No. overall	No. in season	Original release date	Guests
2,555	1	September 4, 2018	Nicki Minaj
Season 16 Premiere
2,556	2	September 5, 2018	Mark Wahlberg, Fleetwood Mac, Congressman Beto O'Rourke
2,557	3	September 6, 2018	Anna Kendrick, Spike Lee, Laura Harrier
2,558	4	September 7, 2018	Cher
2,559	5	September 10, 2018	Michael Strahan & Sara Haines, John David Washington, Dalton Dailey
2,560	6	September 11, 2018	Heidi Klum, Olivia Munn
2,561	7	September 12, 2018	LeBron James, Channing Tatum
2,562	8	September 13, 2018	Kristen Bell, Martha Trujillo, Kimberly Patel
2,563	9	September 14, 2018	Colin Jost, Michael Che
2,564	10	September 17, 2018	Cate Blanchett, Issa Rae
2,565	11	September 18, 2018	Simon Cowell, Olivia Wilde, Jason Mraz
2,566	12	September 19, 2018	Penélope Cruz, Carrie Underwood
2,567	13	September 20, 2018	Kate Hudson, Goldie Hawn
2,568	14	September 21, 2018	Beth Behrs, Bob Moses
2,569	15	September 24, 2018	Benedict Cumberbatch, Cher, Yara Shahidi, Justin Willman
2,570	16	September 25, 2018	Cast of Modern Family
2,571	17	September 26, 2018	Jennifer Hudson, Max Greenfield, LeBron James, Channing Tatum, The Chainsmokers, Kelsea Ballerini, Alaya “Lay Lay” High
2,572	18	September 27, 2018	Lady Gaga
2,573	19	September 28, 2018	Kobe Bryant, Logic, Ryan Tedder
2,574	20	October 1, 2018	The cast of Will & Grace, Jon Dorenbos, Bob Moses
2,575	21	October 2, 2018	Lady Gaga, Justin Hartley
2,576	22	October 3, 2018	Jamie Dornan, Busy Philipps
2,577	23	October 4, 2018	Savannah Guthrie, Channing Tatum and LeBron James, Nacho Figueras, Jungle
2,578	24	October 5, 2018	Kristen Bell, Ayesha Curry and Ciara
Momsplaining the TV Show
2,579	25	October 8, 2018	Jennifer Garner, Kacey Musgraves, Viral Pizza Delivery Piano Player
2,580	26	October 9, 2018	Jenna Fischer, Nicole Maines, Hozier & Mavis Staples
2,581	27	October 10, 2018	Melissa McCarthy, Mary Halsey, Billie Eilish
2,582	28	October 11, 2018	Dakota Johnson, Ken Jeong, CHVRCHES
2,583	29	October 12, 2018	Ryan Gosling, Lenny Kravitz
2,584	30	October 15, 2018	Kunal Nayyar, Ellie Kemper, Thailand Cave Rescue - Wild Boars Soccer Team
2,585	31	October 16, 2018	Keira Knightley, Kathryn Hahn, Old Dominion
2,586	32	October 17, 2018	Ranesa Shipman, Maya Rudolph, Bazzi
2,587	33	October 18, 2018	Chelsea Handler, Kym Douglas
2,588	34	October 19, 2018	Jonah Hill, Whitney Cummings
2,589	35	October 22, 2018	Sarah Silverman
2,590	36	October 23, 2018	Ellen Pompeo, Demetri Martin
2,591	37	October 24, 2018	Jason Sudeikis, Lauren Daigle
2,592	38	October 25, 2018	Sean Combs, Chrissy Teigen
2,593	39	October 26, 2018	Kris Jenner, Ciara
2,594	40	October 29, 2018	David Spade, Marcelito Pomoy
2,595	41	October 30, 2018	Nicole Kidman, Lucas Hedges, Troye Sivan, Koeberle Bull
2,596	42	October 31, 2018	Rebel Wilson
Ellen's Halloween Spectacular
2,597	43	November 1, 2018	Rami Malek
2,598	44	November 2, 2018	Sean Hayes, Fatima Ali
2,599	45	November 5, 2018	Blake Shelton, Joel Edgerton, Dave & Claire Crosby, Ranesa Shipman
2,600	46	November 6, 2018	Eddie Redmayne, Damon Wayans Jr., Marcey Hensley
2,601	47	November 7, 2018	Octavia Spencer, Ariana Grande
2,602	48	November 8, 2018	Leah Remini,
2,603	49	November 9, 2018	Judy Sheindlin, Pharrell Williams
2,604	50	November 12, 2018	Mandy Moore, Travis Scott
2,605	51	November 13, 2018	Mark Wahlberg, Tig Notaro The Zezulka Family
2,606	52	November 14, 2018	Connie Britton, Tyler Belvins, Young Dylan
2,607	53	November 15, 2018	Michelle Obama
2,608	54	November 16, 2018	Adam Levine
2,609	55	November 19, 2018	Emily Blunt, Backstreet Boys
2,610	56	November 20, 2018	Michael B. Jordan
Special Guest Co-Host Chrissy Teigen
2,611	57	November 21, 2018	Kim Kardashian West
2,612	58	November 26, 2018	Howie Mandel, Ashley Graham, Kym Douglas
Day 1 of 12 Days!
2,613	59	November 27, 2018	Lin-Manuel Miranda, Mason Ramsey
Day 2 of 12 Days!
2,614	60	November 28, 2018	John Krasinski, Meek Mill, Padma Lakshmi
Day 3 of 12 Days!
2,615	61	November 29, 2018	Jennifer Lopez
Day 4 of 12 Days!
2,616	62	November 30, 2018	Julia Roberts, Alessia Cara
Day 5 of 12 Days!
2,617	63	December 3, 2018	John Cena, Martha Stewart, Julia Garner
Day 6 of 12 Days!
2,618	64	December 4, 2018	Ryan Reynolds, Gwen Stefani
Day 7 of 12 Days!
2,619	65	December 5, 2018	Natalie Portman, Halsey, Padma Lakshmi, Jeff Garlin
Day 8 of 12 Days!
2,620	66	December 6, 2018	Jennifer Aniston, Dolly Parton
Day 9 of 12 Days!
2,621	67	December 7, 2018	Margot Robbie, Sinbad
Day 10 of 12 Days!
2,622	68	December 10, 2018	Steve Harvey
Day 11 of 12 Days!
2,623	69	December 11, 2018	Amy Adams, Eugene Levy and Catherine O'Hara, Bastille & Marshmello
Day 12 of 12 Days! Special Guest Co-Host Ashton Kutcher
2,624	70	December 12, 2018	Steve Carell, Gisele Bundchen, Kesha
2,625	71	December 13, 2018	Sam Rockwell, Richard Madden, John Cena, Dave Matthews Band
2,626	72	December 14, 2018	Minnie Driver, Steve Spangler, Brett Young
Special Guest Host Ellie Kemper
2,627	73	December 20, 2018	Sandra Bullock, Blake Shelton
2,628	74	January 2, 2019	Heidi Klum, Burt Ward
2,629	75	January 3, 2019	Dax Shepard
2,630	76	January 4, 2019	Kevin Hart
2,631	77	January 7, 2019	Jesse Tyler Ferguson, Kalen Allen
2,632	78	January 8, 2019	Mahershala Ali, Saoirse Ronan
2,633	79	January 9, 2019	Liev Schreiber
2,634	80	January 10, 2019	Chadwick Boseman, Claire Foy
2,635	81	January 11, 2019	Timothée Chalamet, Sarah Hyland
2,636	82	January 14, 2019	Robin Roberts
2,637	83	January 15, 2019	Lily Tomlin and Jane Fonda, Giada De Laurentiis
2,638	84	January 16, 2019	Allison Janney, Maggie Rogers
2,639	85	January 17, 2019	Gwyneth Paltrow
Special Guest Hosts Kate Hudson & Goldie Hawn
2,640	86	January 18, 2019	Samuel L. Jackson, Michael Bublé, Pete Holmes
2,641	87	January 21, 2019	Matthew McConaughey, Blake Shelton & Adam Levine
2,642	88	January 22, 2019	Anne Hathaway, Fred Savage
2,643	89	January 23, 2019	Sarah Paulson, Caroline Quentin & Piers Taylor, Dean Lewis
2,644	90	January 24, 2019	Debra Messing, Future
2,645	91	January 25, 2019	James Corden, Beth Stern
2,646	92	January 28, 2019	Jimmy Kimmel, Miley Cyrus & Mark Ronson
Ellen's Birthday Spectacular
2,647	93	January 29, 2019	Courteney Cox, Christina Aguilera, Lizzo
2,648	94	January 30, 2019	Priyanka Chopra, Boy George & Culture Club
2,649	95	January 31, 2019	Cast of The Big Bang Theory
2,650	96	February 1, 2019	Brie Larson
2,651	97	February 4, 2019	Alec Baldwin
2,652	98	February 5, 2019	Ray Romano, Kelly Clarkson
2,653	99	February 6, 2019	Elizabeth Banks, P!nk
2,654	100	February 7, 2019	Melissa McCarthy & Richard E. Grant
2,655	101	February 8, 2019	Kendall Jenner
2,656	102	February 11, 2019	Chris Pratt, Ella Mai
2,657	103	February 12, 2019	Rebel Wilson
2,658	104	February 13, 2019	Jennifer Lopez
2,659	105	February 14, 2019	Ken Jeong
2,660	106	February 15, 2019	Seth Rogen and Charlize Theron, Elliot Page
2,661	107	February 18, 2019	Justin Hartley, Ken Jeong, Jon Dorenbos
2,662	108	February 19, 2019	Diane Keaton, John Legend, Wolfgang Puck
2,663	109	February 20, 2019	Portia de Rossi, Olivia Munn, Shin Lim
2,664	110	February 21, 2019	Milo Ventimiglia, Florida Georgia Line
2,665	111	February 22, 2019	Wanda Sykes, Robyn
2,666	112	February 25, 2019	Kristen Bell & Dax Shepard
2,667	113	February 26, 2019	Mila Kunis, Mark Ronson, Tavaris Jones
2,668	114	February 27, 2019	Idris Elba
2,669	115	February 28, 2019	Patricia Arquette, Jon Dorenbos, Sharon Van Etten
2,670	116	March 1, 2019	John Mayer
2,671	117	March 11, 2019	Beth Behrs, Jon Dorenbos
2,672	118	March 12, 2019	Colin Farrell, Sophia Lillis
2,673	119	March 13, 2019	Lupita Nyong'o, Chaka Khan
2,674	120	March 14, 2019	Ben Affleck, Tara Westover
2,675	121	March 15, 2019	Max Greenfield, David Gray, The Crazy 8s
Special Guest Host Jason Sudeikis
2,676	122	March 18, 2019	Rob Lowe, Tig Notaro, Jason Sudeikis & Olivia Wilde, The Bachellorette Hannah Brown
2,677	123	March 19, 2019	Michael Keaton, Jay Shetty
2,678	124	March 20, 2019	Senator Cory Booker, Jacob Banks
2,679	125	March 21, 2019	David Letterman, Dermot Kennedy
2,680	126	March 22, 2019	Ben Stiller, Offset & Travis Scott, Jake & Alice Tapper
2,681	127	April 1, 2019	Ed O'Neill, Billie Eilish
2,682	128	April 2, 2019	Woody Harrelson, Joey King, Brothers Osborne
2,683	129	April 3, 2019	Sandra Oh, Rob Thomas, Jane Goodall
2,684	130	April 4, 2019	Megan Mullally, Hasan Minhaj, Greyson Chance
2,685	131	April 5, 2019	Minnie Driver, Maren Morris
2,686	132	April 8, 2019	Chelsea Handler, Jodie Comer
2,687	133	April 9, 2019	Chris Hemsworth, Nikolaj Coster-Waldau, Hozier
2,688	134	April 10, 2019	David Spade, Sara Bareilles
2,689	135	April 11, 2019	Josh Gad, Erika Jayne, Ava Max
Special Guest Host Mila Kunis, Guest DJ Colton Underwood
2,690	136	April 12, 2019	Emma Thompson, Mayor Pete Buttigieg
2,691	137	April 15, 2019	Bill Hader
2,692	138	April 16, 2019	Trevor Noah, James Bay and Julia Michaels
2,693	139	April 17, 2019	Dax Shepard, Brit Marling and Ian Alexander
2,694	140	April 18, 2019	Lily Tomlin, Rob Delaney and Sharon Horgan, Teyana Taylor
2,695	141	April 19, 2019	Leslie Mann, Jenna Dewan, Melissa Etheridge
Special Guest Host John Cena
2,696	142	April 22, 2019	P!nk, O'Shea Jackson Jr.
Ellen's Earth Day Show
2,697	143	April 23, 2019	Scarlett Johansson and Brie Larson, Hannah Hart, Toro y Moi
2,698	144	April 24, 2019	LSD featuring Sia, Diplo and Labrinth
People's Most Beautiful
2,699	145	April 25, 2019	Bradley Cooper
2,700	146	April 26, 2019	Adam Sandler
Million Dollar May Surprise
2,701	147	April 29, 2019	Kourtney Kardashian, Anderson Paak
2,702	148	April 30, 2019	Zac Efron
2,703	149	May 1, 2019	Blake Shelton
2,704	150	May 2, 2019	Diane Keaton, John Bradley
2,705	151	May 3, 2019	Kenan Thompson
2,706	152	May 6, 2019	Julie Bowen
2,707	153	May 7, 2019	Jake Gyllenhaal, Henry Winkler
2,708	154	May 8, 2019	Jason Momoa
2,709	155	May 9, 2019	George Clooney, Willa Amai
2,710	156	May 10, 2019	Kris Jenner
2,711	157	May 13, 2019	Sterling K. Brown, Christopher Abbott
2,712	158	May 14, 2019	Octavia Spencer
2,713	159	May 15, 2019	Taylor Swift, José Andrés
2,714	160	May 16, 2019	Maya Rudolph, Sue Aikens
Special Guest Host Melissa McCarthy
2,715	161	May 17, 2019	Keanu Reeves, OneRepublic
2,716	162	May 20, 2019	Reese Witherspoon
2,717	163	May 21, 2019	Will Smith, Mena Massoud and Naomi Scott
2,718	164	May 22, 2019	Tom Hanks
2,719	165	May 23, 2019	Loni Love, Kunal Nayyar, YG ft. Tyga
Special Guest Host tWitch
2,720	166	May 24, 2019	Snoop Dogg, James Blake
2,721	167	May 28, 2019	Ali Wong, Behati Prinsloo, Willa Amai
2,722	168	May 29, 2019	Thomas Middleditch, 2 Chainz featuring Amerie
Special Guest Host Wanda Sykes
2,723	169	May 30, 2019	Shailene Woodley, Melissa McCarthy, Tiffany Haddish, Elisabeth Moss
2,724	170	May 31, 2019	Mark Wahlberg, Stedman Graham, Adam Lambert
2,725	171	June 3, 2019	Mindy Kaling, Matt Bomer, Kym Douglas, James Bay
2,726	172	June 4, 2019	Harrison Ford, Dr. Ruth Westheimer, Emily Bear
2,727	173	June 5, 2019	Jennifer Aniston, Ayesha Curry
2,728	174	June 6, 2019	Eric Stonestreet, Dan Levy, Sheryl Crow, Bonnie Raitt, Mavis Staples
2,729	175	June 7, 2019	Jaden & Willow Smith, Janet Mock
2,730	176	June 10, 2019	Mario Lopez, Kevin Nealon, Kate Hudson & Goldie Hawn
2,731	177	June 11, 2019	Howie Mandel, Dr. Dean Ornish
2,732	178	June 12, 2019	Olivia Wilde, John Mayer
Special Guest Host Jason Sudeikis
2,733	179	June 13, 2019	Aubrey Plaza, Maggie Rogers, Jennifer Lopez
2,734	180	June 14, 2019	Kumail Nanjiani, Jake Gyllenhaal, Gary Clark Jr.
2,735	181	June 17, 2019	Ellen's Most Talented Kids
2,736	182	June 18, 2019	Ellen's Most Inspiring Stories of Season 16
2,737	183	June 19, 2019	Break the Internet Stars of Season 16
2,738	184	June 20, 2019	Ellen's Superhero Guests of Season 16
2,739	185	June 24, 2019	Ellen's Biggest Hollywood Stars of Season 16
2,740	186	June 25, 2019	Music's Biggest Stars of Season 16
2,741	187	June 26, 2019	Ellen's Funniest Women of Season 16
2,742	188	June 27, 2019	Ellen's Funniest Men of Season 16
2,743	189	June 28, 2019	The Best Celebrity Games of Season 16
