= The Ellen DeGeneres Show season 15 =

The Ellen DeGeneres Show
- Season 15
- Starring: Ellen DeGeneres
- No. of episodes: 177 + 8 specials

Release
- Original release: September 5, 2017 – August 31, 2018

Season chronology
- ← Previous; Season 14 Next → Season 16

This is a list of episodes of the fifteenth season of The Ellen DeGeneres Show (often stylized as ellen15), which began airing from Tuesday, September 5, 2017.

== Episodes ==
No. overall	No. in season	Original release date	Guests
2,379	1	September 5, 2017	Will Ferrell, Mark Wahlberg, Cast of Paw Patrol
2,380	2	September 6, 2017	Reese Witherspoon, Pink
2,381	3	September 7, 2017	Miley Cyrus
Miley Cyrus performs "Younger Now"
2,382	4	September 8, 2017	Halle Berry
2,383	5	September 11, 2017	Queen Latifah, Portugal. The Man
2,384	6	September 12, 2017	Heidi Klum
2,385	7	September 13, 2017	Alec Baldwin, Tig Notaro, Harry MacKenzie, Bigman
2,386	8	September 14, 2017	Jessica Biel, Kym Douglas, Lonzo Ball, LaVar Ball & Luis Fonsi
2,387	9	September 15, 2017	Channing Tatum, Kyle MacLachlan, Grace VanderWaal
2,388	10	September 18, 2017	Justin Theroux, Drew Carey, Grace VanderWaal
2,389	11	September 19, 2017	Sarah Paulson, Nick Jonas
2,390	12	September 20, 2017	Megyn Kelly, Russell Westbrook, Logic & Alessia Cara
2,391	13	September 21, 2017	Judi Dench, Imagine Dragons
2,392	14	September 22, 2017	Jake Gyllenhaal, Kesha, Darci Lynne, Raven
2,393	15	September 25, 2017	Mandy Moore, Sterling K. Brown & Milo Ventimiglia, Macklemore & Kesha
2,394	16	September 26, 2017	Jane Fonda, Taye Diggs, Bleachers
2,395	17	September 27, 2017	Eric Stonestreet, Whitney Cummings, Kelsea Ballerini
2,396	18	September 28, 2017	Jamie Foxx & Jay Pharoah, Cole Swindell
2,397	19	September 29, 2017	LL Cool J, Shania Twain
2,398	20	October 2, 2017	Anthony Anderson, Victoria Arlen & Val Chmerkovskiy
2,399	21	October 3, 2017	Howie Mandel, Rita Ora
2,400	22	October 4, 2017	Oprah Winfrey, Demi Lovato
2,401	23	October 5, 2017	Jared Leto, Savannah Guthrie, Thirty Seconds to Mars
2,402	24	October 6, 2017	Ryan Gosling, Ricky Martin, Usher, Cast of The Goldbergs
2,403	25	October 9, 2017	Harrison Ford
2,404	26	October 10, 2017	Josh Gad, Charlie Puth
2,405	27	October 11, 2017	Gina Rodriguez, French Montana, Sean Combs, Swae Lee, Child Devolpment Center
2,406	28	October 12, 2017	Kate Hudson, Nacho Figueras, Andra Day & Common
2,407	29	October 13, 2017	Mindy Kaling, Bethenny Frankel, Anderson East
2,408	30	October 16, 2017	Cate Blanchett, Taylor Kitsch, Dain Yoon
2,409	31	October 17, 2017	Andrew Garfield, Snoop Dogg, Beck, Miles Brown
2,410	32	October 18, 2017	Laura Dern, Arcade Fire
2,411	33	October 19, 2017	Dax Shepard, Jordan Fisher & Lindsay Arnold, HAIM
2,412	34	October 20, 2017	Paris Jackson, Niall Horan, Kunal Nayyar
2,413	35	October 23, 2017	Justin Hartley, Bobby Moynihan, Jordan Fisher & Lindsay Arnold
2,414	36	October 24, 2017	Michael Strahan, Sam Smith
2,415	37	October 25, 2017	Cast of Stranger Things, Sean Hayes, Finn Wolfhard, Gaten Matarazzo, Caleb McLaughlin & Noah Schnapp, Sheryl Crow
2,416	38	October 26, 2017	Matt Damon, Luke Bryan
2,417	39	October 27, 2017	Kristen Bell, Mila Kunis & Kathryn Hahn, Kelly Clarkson
2,418	40	October 30, 2017	Jim Parsons & Iain Armitage, Demi Lovato, Ziqi Li
2,419	41	October 31, 2017	Julie Bowen, Sofie Dossi, J Balvin
Halloween Show
2,420	42	November 1, 2017	Ricky Gervais
2,421	43	November 2, 2017	Kerry Washington
2,422	44	November 3, 2017	Kris Jenner, Brielle Milla Paw Patrol
2,423	45	November 6, 2017	Jesse Tyler Ferguson, Zully Hernandez
2,424	46	November 7, 2017	Adam Levine, Maroon 5
2,425	47	November 8, 2017	Idris Elba, Nate Seltzer
2,426	48	November 9, 2017	Wanda Sykes, Halsey (Ellen's 2,500th Show)
2,427	49	November 10, 2017	Owen Wilson, Chris Long, St. Vincent, Tavaris,Katy Perry
2,428	50	November 13, 2017	Vice President Joe Biden, Jon Dorenbos, Justin Bieber
2,429	51	November 14, 2017	Colin Farrell, Dax Shepard, Lady Gaga
2,430	52	November 15, 2017	Kim Kardashian West, Reuben de Maid, Imagine Dragons
2,431	53	November 16, 2017	Blake Shelton, Jacob Tremblay, Steve Spangler
2,432	54	November 17, 2017	Ty Burrell, Lin-Manuel Miranda
2,433	55	November 20, 2017	Garth Brooks, Lady Gaga
Day 1 of 12 Days!
2,434	56	November 21, 2017	Sofía Vergara, Barbra Streisand
Day 2 of 12 Days!
2,435	57	November 22, 2017	Beth Behrs, Channing Tatum
Day 3 of 12 Days!
2,436	58	November 27, 2017	Eric McCormack, BTS
Day 4 of 12 Days!
2,437	59	November 28, 2017	Mark Hamill, Ben Platt. Kym Douglas, Liam Payne
Day 5 of 12 Days!
2,438	60	November 29, 2017	Bryan Cranston, Timothée Chalamet & Armie Hammer, Daya
Day 6 of 12 Days!
2,439	61	November 30, 2017	Chelsea Handler, Molly Bloom, Sam Smith
Day 7 of 12 Days!
2,440	62	December 1, 2017	Octavia Spencer, Dave Franco, Ed Sheeran, Kim Basinger, Cast of Young Sheldon
Day 8 of 12 Days!
2,441	63	December 4, 2017	Tiffany Haddish, Blake Shelton
Day 9 of 12 Days!
2,442	64	December 5, 2017	Chris Pratt & Bryce Dallas Howard, The National
Day 10 of 12 Days!
2,443	65	December 6, 2017	Neil Patrick Harris, Padma Lakshmi, Chris Stapleton
Day 11 of 12 Days!
2,444	66	December 7, 2017	Allison Janney
Day 12 of 12 Days!
2,445	67	December 8, 2017	Sebastian Stan, Gwen Stefani
Day 13 of 12 Days!
2,446	68	December 11, 2017	Jennifer Hudson
Day 14 of 12 Days!
2,447	69	December 12, 2017	Dwayne Johnson, Kevin Hart, Luke Bryan, Lady Gaga
Day 15 of 12 Days!
2,448	70	December 13, 2017	Pitch Perfect 3 cast, Mario Lopez, Sia, Lady Gaga
2,449	71	December 14, 2017	Will Smith, Queens of the Stone Age
2,450	72	December 15, 2017	Hillary Clinton, Khalid
2,451	73	January 2, 2018	Ricky Martin
2,452	74	January 3, 2018	Seth Meyers, The Four: Battle For Stardom cast, Charlie Puth
2,453	75	January 4, 2018	Khloé Kardashian
2,454	76	January 5, 2018	Kumail Nanjiani, Lady Gaga
2,455	77	January 8, 2018	Debra Messing
2,456	78	January 9, 2018	Tom Hanks & Meryl Streep
2,457	79	January 10, 2018	Margot Robbie
2,458	80	January 11, 2018	Helen Mirren, Luke Evans
2,459	81	January 12, 2018	Ted Danson
2,460	82	January 15, 2018	Hugh Jackman, Demi Lovato
2,461	83	January 16, 2018	Penélope Cruz, Freddie Highmore, LANCO
2,462	84	January 17, 2018	Sarah Jessica Parker, Camila Cabello
Camila Cabello performs "Havana"
2,463	85	January 18, 2018	Saoirse Ronan, Dierks Bentley
2,464	86	January 19, 2018	Dax Shepard, Nicole Richie, Mumford & sons
2,465	87	January 22, 2018	Chadwick Boseman, Jeff Garlin, Kalen Allen
2,466	88	January 23, 2018	Hoda Kotb, First Aid Kit
2,467	89	January 25, 2018	Ed O'Neill, Pharrell Williams & N.E.R.D.
2,468	90	January 26, 2018	Kristen Bell, DNCE (Ellen's 60th Birthday)
2,469	91	January 29, 2018	Megan Mullally, The 15:17 to Paris cast
2,470	92	January 30, 2018	Season 15's Greatest Moments So Far,Adele
2,471	93	January 31, 2018	Jamie Dornan, Troye Sivan
2,472	94	February 1, 2018	Michelle Obama, Portia de Rossi, Surprise appearances by Jimmy Kimmel, Jamie Foxx, Sofía Vergara, and Chance the Rapper
Ellen's 60th Birthday Extravaganza, Part 1
2,473	95	February 2, 2018	Portia de Rossi, Surprise Appearances by Jennifer Aniston, Kevin Hart and Channing Tatum
Ellen's 60th Birthday Extravaganza, Part 2
2,474	96	February 5, 2018	Melissa McCarthy, Gus Kenworthy
2,475	97	February 6, 2018	Michael B. Jordan, Average Andy at Cirque du Soleil
2,476	98	February 7, 2018	Milo Ventimiglia, Dax Shepard, Claire & Dave Crosby
2,477	99	February 8, 2018	Sean Combs
2,478	100	February 9, 2018	Drew Barrymore
2,479	101	February 12, 2018	John Krasinski, Greta Gerwig
2,480	102	February 13, 2018	Jerry Seinfeld, Nick Foles, Dua Lipa
2,481	103	February 14, 2018	Natalie Portman, Dax Shepard
2,482	104	February 15, 2018	David Spade, Sam Smith, Kalen Allen
2,483	105	February 16, 2018	Steph Curry & Ayesha Curry, Ziqi Li aka Lil' Mushroom
2,484	106	February 19, 2018	Chrissy Teigen, The Fosters cast, Macey Hensley
2,485	107	February 20, 2018	Diane Keaton, Nate Seltzer
2,486	108	February 21, 2018	Bill Gates, Kellie Pickler, Keala Settle
2,487	109	February 22, 2018	Oprah Winfrey
2,488	110	February 23, 2018	Josh Duhamel, Tavaris Jones
2,489	111	February 26, 2018	Heidi Klum, Tonya Harding
2,490	112	February 27, 2018	Jimmy Kimmel
2,491	113	February 28, 2018	Cast of Scandal,Lady Gaga
2,492	114	March 1, 2018	Adam Rippon, Mandy Moore, Adam Devine, Dan + Shay
2,493	115	March 2, 2018	Jennifer Lawrence, Laverne Cox, Meghan Trainor
2,494	116	March 12, 2018	Bill Hader, Auliʻi Cravalho, Jon Dorenbos
2,495	117	March 13, 2018	Dana Carvey, Ronda Rousey, 21 Savage
2,496	118	March 14, 2018	Sean Hayes, Nick Robinson, Dua Lipa
2,497	119	March 15, 2018	Kendall Jenner, Becca Kufrin, Portugal. The Man
2,498	120	March 16, 2018	Jennifer Garner, RuPaul
2,499	121	March 19, 2018	Allison Janney, Zach Woods
2,500	122	March 20, 2018	Tessa Virtue & Scott Moir, John Oliver, Cast of Tag
2,501	123	March 21, 2018	Mila Kunis & Kate McKinnon, Camila Cabello, Jenna Fischer & Oliver Hudson
2,502	124	March 22, 2018	Ellen Pompeo, Devin Dawson, Adam Rippon
2,503	125	March 23, 2018	John Cena, Sigourney Weaver, Jhene Aiko & Rae Sremmurd
2,504	126	April 2, 2018	Dwayne Johnson, Logic
2,505	127	April 3, 2018	Lauren Graham, Kacey Musgraves
2,506	128	April 4, 2018	Seth Rogen, Giada De Laurentiis, Bob Roth
2,507	129	April 5, 2018	Kristen Bell, Sen. Kamala Harris
2,508	130	April 6, 2018	Ice Cube, Aubrey Plaza
2,509	131	April 9, 2018	Alex Rodriguez, Christina Hendricks
2,510	132	April 10, 2018	Eva Longoria, Colin Hanks
2,511	133	April 11, 2018	Anna Faris, John Legend, Pauly D
2,512	134	April 12, 2018	Helen Hunt, Andy Cohen
2,513	135	April 13, 2018	Jason Sudeikis, Ali Wong
2,514	136	April 16, 2018	Tracee Ellis Ross, Jason Aldean
2,515	137	April 17, 2018	Steve Harvey, Samira Wiley, Jon Dorenbos
2,516	138	April 18, 2018	Amy Schumer, Evan Rachel Wood, Bebe Rexha & Florida Georgia Line
2,517	139	April 19, 2018	Cardi B, Thomas Middleditch, Bazzi
2,518	140	April 20, 2018	Elisabeth Moss, Van Jones
Ellen's Earth Day Show
2,519	141	April 23, 2018	Macaulay Culkin, Constance Wu & Henry Golding
2,520	142	April 24, 2018	Scarlett Johansson, Jake Tapper, Parquet Courts
2,521	143	April 25, 2018	Charlize Theron, Danai Gurira
2,522	144	April 26, 2018	Chris Hemsworth, Kelly Clarkson
2,523	145	April 27, 2018	Benedict Cumberbatch, Keith Urban
2,524	146	April 30, 2018	Kim Kardashian West
2,525	147	May 1, 2018	Justin Timberlake
2,526	148	May 2, 2018	Jennifer Lopez, Derek Hough, Ne-Yo and Jenna Dewan
2,527	149	May 3, 2018	Julie Bowen, Leon Bridges
2,528	150	May 4, 2018	Melissa McCarthy & Life of the Party cast
2,529	151	May 7, 2018	Adam Levine, Maroon 5
2,530	152	May 8, 2018	Woody Harrelson, Gayle King, Panic! At The Disco
2,531	153	May 9, 2018	Rob Lowe
2,532	154	May 10, 2018	Jennifer Garner, Kym Douglas
Ellen's Mothers Day Show
2,533	155	May 11, 2018	Jane Fonda, Foo Fighters
2,534	156	May 14, 2018	Sarah Paulson
2,535	157	May 15, 2018	U2's Bono & The Edge, Diane Keaton
2,536	158	May 16, 2018	Portia de Rossi, James Bay
2,537	159	May 17, 2018	Sandra Bullock, Shawn Mendes
2,538	160	May 18, 2018	Jason Bateman, World of Dance finalists The Lab
2,539	161	May 21, 2018	Donald Glover & Alden Ehrenreich, The Hatala Sisters
2,540	162	May 22, 2018	David Spade, Maren Morris & Zedd, Kalen Allen
2,541	163	May 23, 2018	Mark Wahlberg, So You Think You Can Dance All-Stars
2,542	164	May 24, 2018	Amy Poehler & Nick Offerman, Tig Notaro
2,543	165	May 25, 2018	BTS, Ewan McGregor
2,544	166	May 29, 2018	Jon Hamm, Brandi Carlile
2,545	167	May 30, 2018	Olivia Munn, Tony Hale
Special Guest Host Sean Hayes
2,546	168	May 31, 2018	Jamie Foxx and Corinne Foxx, Fall Out Boy
Special Guest Host Kristen Bell
2,547	169	June 1, 2018	Ellen's Biggest Music Stars of Season 15
2,548	170	June 4, 2018	Mindy Kaling, Michael Ray
2,549	171	June 5, 2018	Jim Parsons, Young Dylan
2,550	172	June 6, 2018	Samuel L. Jackson, Dan Reynolds
2,551	173	June 7, 2018	Anne Hathaway, Darren Criss
2,551	174	June 11, 2018	Howie Mandel, Shaquille O'Neal
Special	Special	June 12, 2018	Ellen's Most Memorable Kids of Season 15
Special	Special	June 13, 2018	Viral Stars of Season 15 with Kalen Allen
Special	Special	June 14, 2018	Ellen's First-Timers of Season 15
Special	Special	June 15, 2018	Ellen's Funny Ladies of Season 15
Special	Special	June 18, 2018	Ellen's Inspiring Stories of Season 15
Special	Special	June 19, 2018	Hollywood's Biggest Stars of Season 15
Special	Special	June 20, 2018	Ellen's Funny Guys of Season 15
Special	Special	June 21, 2018	Sports All-Stars of Season 15
2,552	175	August 29, 2018	Mel B, Grocery Store Joe, Jon Dorenbos
Special Guest Host Lea Michele
2,553	176	August 30, 2018	Kathryn Hahn, BTS
Special Guest Host Mario Lopez
2,554	177	August 31, 2018	Topher Grace, Kacey Musgraves
Special Guest Host Mario Lopez
