= The Toy Box =

- Genre: Reality
- Directed by: Adam Sampson
- Presented by: Eric Stonestreet
- Composers: Jason Moss; Tripp Holland
- Country of origin: United States
- Original language: English
- No. of seasons: 2
- No. of episodes: 16

Production
- Executive producers: Michael Rourke; Chris Grant; Drew Buckley; Richard Dickson; Catherine Balsam-Schwaber; Julia Pistor; Susan House; Hamilton South
- Producer: John-Liam Stapleton
- Production location: The Prospect Studios
- Editors: Julie Antepli; Devrim Wellman; Jeremy Walters; Jonah Max
- Running time: 60 minutes
- Production companies: Mattel Creations; Hudsun Media; Electus; Toys “R” Us

Original release
- Network: ABC
- Release: April 7 – November 19, 2017

The Toy Box is an American reality television show that debuted on April 7, 2017, on ABC. The show is about contestants as aspiring entrepreneurs, who present toy inventions first to a panel of toy industry professionals, then to a panel of child-judges. Only toys approved by the mentors are presented to the judges, "In the Toy Box," who select one toy to advance to the finals of each episode. The season's winning toy is produced and distributed by Mattel and sold exclusively at Toys "R" Us stores.

On June 16, 2017, ABC renewed the series for a second season, which premiered on October 1, 2017, and ended on November 19, 2017. After Toys "R" Us announced that all United Kingdom and United States operations would be going out of business, the show was not renewed for a third season.

== Judges ==
=== Kids ===
In Season 1, a group of child-judges, up to the age of 13, play with the toys entered into the competition following the panel of toy industry experts. The children then vote on which toy was the best in each episode. Season 1 had four child-judges that consistently appeared in each episode.

In Season 2, the professional judging did not occur on camera. Season 2 had ten child-judges, five of which were selected to judge for each episode. Only one child-judge from Season 1 (Noah Ritter) returned as a judge in Season 2.

Kids	Age	Seasons	
Kids	Age	1	2
Noah Ritter	7–8 (Note: Noah was 7 years old in season 1, and 8 years old in season 2.)	Main	
Sophia Grace Brownlee	13	Main	
Aalyrah Caldwell	8	Main	
Toby Grey	9	Main	
Adi Ash	10		Main
Paxton Booth	7		Main
Sydney Mae Estrella	9		Main
Kyle Lee	7		Main
Joachim Powell	11		Main
Gideon Reynolds	6		Main
Emma Sobel	9		Main
Madison Stevens	8		Main
Olivia Trujillo	12		Main

=== Professionals ===
In Season 1, three professional judges and mentors (who were esteemed toy reviewers and children's product creators) reviewed each product before it was sent to the child judges. This process happened off-screen. The professional judges in Season 1 were:

- Dylan Lauren
- Jim Silver
- Jen Tan

The identity of the professional judges was not disclosed to viewers in Season 2.

== Production ==
The Toy Box was developed by Hudsun Media and Electus. ABC and Mattel Creation agreed that Hudsun would produce the show on their behalf. In October 2016, ABC picked up the show and Mattel greenlit the show for the 2016–17 Season. Eric Stonestreet was indicated at that time as being the host.

== Episodes ==
=== Season 1 (2017) ===
"YES" and "NO" indicate the adult panel results; "FINALIST" designates the toy chosen by the child jury to advance to the finals.

No. overall	No. in season	Title	Original release date	Prod. code	US viewers (millions)
1	1	"Episode 1"	April 7, 2017	101	4.09
"Arya Ball" nested sports balls (YES; FINALIST); "Wacky Worm Racing Game" cloth outfit (NO); "Niya Doll" talking multilanguage multicultural doll collection (YES); "Swurfer" backyard swing (NO); "Party Cannon" that launches candy when target is hit (YES)
2	2	"Episode 2"	April 14, 2017	103	3.26
"Butterfly Book" double-sided dual view books with swiveling pages (NO); "My Ballerina Doll" dolls that are articulated for standard ballet positions (YES; FINALIST); "Snap N’ Roll" pocket-size cars each with a launcher on its rear (YES); "Lil’ Fruityz" fruit-themed scented plush dolls (NO); "Piñata Backpack" that disperses all of its candy when a string is pulled (YES)
3	3	"Episode 3"	April 21, 2017	107	3.13
"Tubelox" lifesize construction set (YES); "Pool Cubes" submerged building blocks (NO); "Emoti Plush" plush dolls with adjustable facial expressions (YES); "The Grid" game mat with tossed tokens (NO); "Lightbox Terrier" creative art lightbox (YES; FINALIST)
4	4	"Episode 4"	April 28, 2017	102	2.60
"Grandmas2Share" grandma-themed plush dolls (YES); "The Walking Dinosaur" wheeled skeleton (NO); "Parashoot" slingshot-parachute (YES); "Cardtivity" construction set of plastic cards (NO); "Chromotag" wearable tag that changes color when it gets wet (YES; FINALIST)
5	5	"Episode 5"	May 5, 2017	104	2.78
"Wiggies" dolls with customizable hair (YES; FINALIST); "Jumpstix" pogo stick scooter (NO); "Maze-O" buildable color squares (YES); "Dueling Wizards" wands with throw-rings (YES); "Plaliens" plush poseable space-aliens (YES)
6	6	"Episode 6"	May 12, 2017	105	2.33
"Candy Krusher" soft-food reshaper [updated "Toot Sweet" 1968 toy] (YES; FINALIST); "Connectimals" reconfigurable plush toys (YES); "Bitblocks" construction blocks (NO); "Curly Girls United" dolls with curly hair (NO); "Quadball" rolling-ball tabletop game (YES)
7	7	"Episode 7" (first hour)	May 19, 2017	106	2.43
"Cock it, Drop it, Rocket" spring-loaded self-launcher prototype (NO); "Noisy Person Cards" partygame about creative voices (YES); "3D Liquid Art" colored water art (YES; FINALIST); "Pre-Bot" eco-friendly wooden robot-shaped doll (YES); "Bedtime Story Bug" plush ladybug with three recordable audio messages (YES)
8	8	"Episode 8" (second hour)	May 19, 2017	108	2.43
In the Finals, each of the seven chosen finalist toys return. After all playing with the finalist toys once more, each of the child judges eliminates one toy from the competition (Toby with "Chromotag", Aalyrah with "My Ballerina Doll", Sophia Grace with "Wiggies", and Noah with "Arya Ball"). Out of the Final 3 ("Lightbox Terrier", "Candy Krusher" and "3D Liquid Art"), the winning toy (to be produced and sold in stores) is "3D Liquid Art".

=== Season 2 (2017) ===
"YES" and "NO" indicate the child panel results (getting at least three "Yes" votes from the five child judges); "FINALIST" designates the toy chosen by the child jury to advance to the finals.

No. overall	No. in season	Title	Original release date	Prod. code	US viewers (millions)
9	1	"Episode 1"	October 1, 2017	202	2.18
Judges: Emma, Gideon, Joachim, Paxton, Sydney Toys: "Soldier Ball" strategic bowling game (YES); "Flip-O-Matic" gamepiece launcher and target (NO); "Water Dodger" shields and sponge balls (YES; FINALIST); "Patio Pong" ball toss (NO); "Cyborg Princess" futuristic statues (YES); "Thingamatink" blanket with zippers (NO); "Go Chopstix" toy sushi and chopsticks (YES)
10	2	"Episode 2"	October 8, 2017	201	1.87
Judges: Adi, Kyle, Madison, Noah, Olivia Toys: "Monster Dice" (NO); "CLICKEYbits" fidget toy (YES; FINALIST); "Furry Friends" moving and singing animal dolls (YES); "Mad Moves" card game with dancing (NO); "Noochie Golf" constructable miniature golf (YES); "Water Bugs" table game with splashing (NO); "The Bloom" mind-controlled flower (NO) Visited with the Judges: Ryan Stuart (the inventor of the winning toy of season one)
11	3	"Episode 3"	October 15, 2017	203	2.28
Judges: Emma, Kyle, Noah, Olivia, Paxton Toys: "Chainy Charms" collectable jewelry (YES); "Fortune Spinner" labelled figit spinners (YES); "Hugalopes" modular plush toys (YES); "Rocket Pocket" inflatable target (NO); "Water Constructor" modular outdoor wet game (YES; FINALIST); "Botallions" tabletop strategy game (NO); "Atom Ball" that lights up when yelled at (NO)
12	4	"Episode 4"	October 22, 2017	207	2.30
Judges: Adi, Emma, Joachim, Olivia, Paxton Toys: "PlayOut" exercise cards (YES); "Pillow Fight Pals" electronic plush pillows (YES); "Hovercraft" build-it kit with remote control (YES, FINALIST); "Fidget Flow Toy" moveable framework (NO); "Flexxball" ball and paddle game (NO); "TechnoChic DIY" wearable electronic art (NO); "Mind Games" hidden buzzer game (NO) Visited with the Judges: Chris Down (the head of Hot Wheels at Mattel)
13	5	"Episode 5"	October 29, 2017	204	2.01
Judges: Adi, Gideon, Joachim, Madison, Sydney Toys: "Camp Outrageous" camping boardgame (YES); "RoboMustache" robot-shaped articulated wooden toys (YES); "ArchipelaGolf" portable tabletop golf-like game (YES, FINALIST); "Hybrid Creatures" plush toys (YES); "My Doll Room" dollhouse (NO); "Glow Flyer" computerized frisbee (YES); "Tournament of Towers" building game (NO)
14	6	"Episode 6"	November 5, 2017	206	2.38
Judges: Emma, Joachim, Madison, Noah, Paxton Toys: "Ninja Cards" throwing cards and target-board (YES; FINALIST); "Orbitwheels" hoverskates (NO); "Look Who’s President" boardgame (NO); "Earth Wurm Works" made from recycled items (YES); "Huck Hopper" jumper frogs and targets (NO); "Eardorables" plush stoys with storage (YES); "Putty Pets" clay animals (YES); "RPS Revolution" rock-paper-scissors game (NO) Visited with the Judges: Jim Silver (toy expert and was one of the season one adult panelists)
15	7	"Episode 7"	November 12, 2017	205	2.34
Judges: Adi, Gideon, Kyle, Olivia, Sydney Toys: "Corky’s Porkys" boardgame (YES); "Giggle Chips" cards (NO); "Knuckle-Racket" paddles and bouncing ball (YES); "Poshies" animal rings (YES; FINALIST); "Sportboard" rotating balance-board (YES); "Secret Drawing Dogs" plush toy with builtin marker and drawing book (NO); "Animation Dome" a zoetrope (NO); "STEM’s Creativity Kit" supplies (YES) Visited with the Judges: Ariana ("President of Play" at Toys "R" Us)
16	8	"Episode 8"	November 19, 2017	208	3.08
In the Finals, each of the seven chosen winning toys return. In this episode, Eric Stonestreet split the ten judges into five teams. After all the teams had played with the toys once more, each of the teams eliminated one toy from the competition (Madison and Gideon with "CLICKEYbits", Emma and Joachim with "Poshies", Olivia and Kyle with "Ninja Cards", Sydney and Adi with "Water Constructor", and Noah and Paxton with "ArchipelaGolf"). Out of the Final 2 toys ("Water Dodger" and "Hovercraft") the winning toy (to be made and sold exclusively at Toys "R" Us stores) is "Water Dodger". Visited with the Judges: Richard Dickson (President of Mattel)

== List of toys featured at Toys "R" Us ==
Other than the guaranteed Mattel contract for the winner, other non-winning toys are also featured at Toys "R" Us. Occasionally, the toy's branding changes before being distributed.

=== Season 1 ===
- "Artsplash™ 3D Liquid Art" – appeared on "Episode 7" and "Episode 8" as "3D Liquid Art"
- "Sweet Shaper™" – appeared on "Episode 6" and "Episode 8" as "Candy Krusher"
- "Noisy Persons™ Card Game" – appeared on "Episode 7" as "Noisy Person Cards"

=== Season 2 ===
- "Hydroshield™ Water Dodger" – appeared on "Episode 1" and "Episode 8" as "Water Dodger"
- "Eardorables™" appeared on "Episode 6"
- "Wobb-Ball™" appeared on "Episode 4" as "Flexxball"

== List of all toys presented ==
=== Season 1 ===
Episode	Seq.	Toy Name	Presented By	Availability
"Episode 1"	1	Arya Ball	Babak from Carlsbad, California	Crowd funding
"Episode 1"	2	Wacky Worm Racing Game	Cedric from Orlando, Florida	Not yet available
"Episode 1"	3	Niya Doll	Darla from Columbia, South Carolina	Crowd funding
"Episode 1"	4	Swurfer	Rob from Charleston, South Carolina	Available
"Episode 1"	5	Party Cannon	Rick from Miami Springs, Florida	Not yet available
"Episode 2"	1	Butterfly Book	Michelle from Naples, Florida	Not yet available
"Episode 2"	2	My Ballerina Doll	Tiffany and Mark from Murrieta, California	Available
"Episode 2"	3	Snap N’ Roll	Greg from Land O Lakes, Florida	Not yet available
"Episode 2"	4	Lil’ Fruityz	Jason from Hackettstown, New Jersey	Available
"Episode 2"	5	Piñata Backpack	Rebecca and Nicholas from Grass Valley, California	Not yet available
"Episode 3"	1	Tubelox	Rachel and Steve from Pleasant Grove, Utah	Available
"Episode 3"	2	Pool Cubes	Troy from Fayetteville, Arkansas	Not yet available
"Episode 3"	3	Emoti Plush	Padmini from Naperville, Illinois	Available
"Episode 3"	4	The Grid	Tom from Farmington, CT, and Mike from Sandy Hook, CT	Unknown
"Episode 3"	5	Lightbox Terrier	Melissa from Pleasant Hill, California	Not yet available
"Episode 4"	1	Grandmas2Share	Marguerite from Staten Island, New York	Available
"Episode 4"	2	The Walking Dinosaur	Rick from Sacramento, California	Unknown
"Episode 4"	3	Parashoot	Jackson from Gainesville, Georgia	Unknown
"Episode 4"	4	Cardtivity	Steve from Randolph, New Jersey	Crowd funding
"Episode 4"	5	Chromotag	Larry and Steven from Chicago, Illinois	Not yet available
"Episode 5"	1	Wiggies	Kim from Los Angeles, California	Not yet available
"Episode 5"	2	Jumpstix	Peter from Camarillo, California	Unknown
"Episode 5"	3	Maze-O	Jessica and Daniel from Lino Lakes, Minnesota	Available
"Episode 5"	4	Dueling Wizards	Joe from Dearborn, Michigan	Not yet available
"Episode 5"	5	Plaliens	Melanie and Beth from Bakersfield, California	Not yet available
"Episode 6"	1	Candy Krusher	Barry from Dallas, Texas	Available
"Episode 6"	2	Connectimals	Kurt and Hannah from Westfield, Wisconsin	Not yet available
"Episode 6"	3	Bitblocks	Will from Portland, Oregon	Not yet available
"Episode 6"	4	Curly Girls United	Margaret from Tinley Park, Illinois	Available
"Episode 6"	5	Quadball	Chris from Huntington Beach, California	Not yet available
"Episode 7"	1	Cock it, Drop it, Rocket	Perry from Fort Lauderdale, Florida	Unknown
"Episode 7"	2	Noisy Person Cards	Kat and James from Chicago, Illinois	Available
"Episode 7"	3	3D Liquid Art	Ryan from Phoenix, Arizona	Available
"Episode 7"	4	Pre-Bot	Roderick from Groton, Massachusetts	Not yet available
"Episode 7"	5	Bedtime Story Bug	Lori from Overland Park, Kansas	Available

=== Season 2 ===
Episode	Seq.	Toy Name	Presented By	Availability
"Episode 1"	1	Soldier Ball	Nate and Isaac from Albany, Georgia	Available
"Episode 1"	2	Flip-O-Matic	Brad from New York, New York	Unknown
"Episode 1"	3	Water Dodger	Nate from South Euclid, Ohio	Available
"Episode 1"	4	Patio Pong	Melissa from Woodstock, Georgia	Available
"Episode 1"	5	Cyborg Princess	James from Beaverton, Oregon	Unknown
"Episode 1"	6	Thingamatink	Erin and Kayla from Oakland, California	Available
"Episode 1"	7	Go Chopstix	Chuck from San Diego, California	Not yet available
"Episode 2"	1	Monster Dice	Brian from Erie, Pennsylvania	Crowd funding
"Episode 2"	2	CLICKEYbits	Shep from Jenkintown, Pennsylvania	Available
"Episode 2"	3	Furry Friends	Lisa from New York, New York	Unknown
"Episode 2"	4	Mad Moves	Ashley from Delray Beach, Florida	Crowd funding
"Episode 2"	5	Noochie Golf	JoAnn, Sal, Dominic and Tre from Phoenix, Arizona	Available
"Episode 2"	6	Water Bugs	Roger from Hampton, Connecticut	Unknown
"Episode 2"	7	The Bloom	Steve from San Francisco, California	Available
"Episode 3"	1	Chainy Charms	Lizzy from Las Vegas, Nevada	Not yet available
"Episode 3"	2	Fortune Spinner	Mark from Cincinnati, Ohio	Available
"Episode 3"	3	Hugalopes	Jazz from Oakland, California	Available
"Episode 3"	4	Rocket Pocket	Gary and Nan from Tampa, Florida	Not yet available
"Episode 3"	5	Water Constructor	Steven and Damaris from Logan, Utah	Not yet available
"Episode 3"	6	Botallions	Colin from Reno, Nevada	Crowd funding
"Episode 3"	7	Atom Ball	Robert from Baytown, Texas	Not yet available
"Episode 4"	1	PlayOut	Eddie from Atlanta, Georgia	Available
"Episode 4"	2	Pillow Fight Pals	Kyla from Phoenix, Arizona	Not yet available
"Episode 4"	3	Hovercraft	Bob from Cordova, Illinois	Unknown
"Episode 4"	4	Fidget Flow Toy	Jennifer from Saranac, Michigan	Not yet available
"Episode 4"	5	Flexxball	Sanel and Priyam from Chicago, Illinois	Available
"Episode 4"	6	TechnoChic DIY	Natasha from Jersey City, New Jersey	Available
"Episode 4"	7	Mind Games	Marvin from Los Angeles, California	Unknown
"Episode 5"	1	Camp Outrageous	Thom from Chicago, Illinois	Unknown
"Episode 5"	2	RoboMustache	Charles from Asheboro, North Carolina	Available
"Episode 5"	3	ArchipelaGolf	Doyle from Clovis, California	Available
"Episode 5"	4	Hybrid Creatures	Pamela from Pleasant Grove, Utah	Unknown
"Episode 5"	5	My Doll Room	Rory and Molly from Lakeville, Connecticut	Available
"Episode 5"	6	Glow Flyer	Michael and Michael from Clifton Park, New York	Crowd funding
"Episode 5"	7	Tournament of Towers	Donovan and Jeff from Los Angeles, California	Not yet available
"Episode 6"	1	Ninja Cards	Dustin from Irvine, CA, and Ken from Chicago, IL	Available
"Episode 6"	2	Orbitwheels	Ywanne from Camas, Washington	Available
"Episode 6"	3	Look Who's President	Edgar from Chicago, Illinois	Available
"Episode 6"	4	Earth Wurm Works	Stephanie from Simi Valley, California	Unknown
"Episode 6"	5	Huck Hopper	Jesse from Fairmount, West Virginia	Crowd funding
"Episode 6"	6	Eardorables	Kelly from San Diego, California	Available
"Episode 6"	7	Putty Pets	Jerrett from Aurora, Colorado	Unknown
"Episode 6"	8	RPS Revolution	Kathy from Wheaton, Illinois	Unknown
"Episode 7"	1	Corky's Porkys	Colt from Spanish Fork, Utah	Available
"Episode 7"	2	Giggle Chips	Jennifer and Charlotte from Whittier, California	Available
"Episode 7"	3	Knuckle-Racket	Jose from Miami, Florida	Not yet available
"Episode 7"	4	Poshies	Blythe from San Juan Capistrano, California	Unknown
"Episode 7"	5	Sportboard	Randy from Williamsburg, Virginia	Unknown
"Episode 7"	6	Secret Drawing Dogs	Heidi from Cape Coral, Florida	Not yet available
"Episode 7"	7	Animation Dome	Les from Lincoln, California	Crowd funding
"Episode 7"	8	STEM's Creativity Kit	Kimberly and John from Orlando, Florida	Crowd funding

== See also ==
- Shark Tank
- American Inventor
