= Noah Ritter =

Viral YouTube Personality

- Born: November 19, 2008 (age 17)
- Other name: The Apparently Kid

YouTube information
- Channel: @theapparentlykid1968
- Subscribers: 95 thousand
- Views: 4.9 million
- Last updated: February 2025

Noah Ritter (born November 19, 2008), better known as the "Apparently Kid", is an American YouTube personality. Ritter rose to viral fame in August 2014 immediately following an interview with a reporter for local TV station ABC-affiliate WNEP-TV at the Wayne County Fair, in Honesdale, Pennsylvania.

As of February 2025, the interview, titled Apparently This Kid is Awesome, Steals the Show During Interview, has more than 70 million views on WNEP-TV's YouTube page, and is the most-watched video in the station's history.

== Early life ==
Ritter was born to Meggin Borowski of Upper Pottsgrove, Pennsylvania and Matthew Ritter, of Toms River, New Jersey. Ritter spent summers in Wilkes-Barre, Pennsylvania with his grandparents. His "Grandpa Jack" (John) Borowski, a retired bridge carpenter, was heavily involved in raising Ritter, and he took him to the Wayne County Fair every year while Ritter grew up. Borowski has deep ties to the fair himself, showing cattle during his childhood.

WNEP-TV covers the Wilkes-Barre-Scranton television market, including Wayne County, which borders New York state. Reporter Sofia Ojeda interviewed 5-year-old Ritter along with several other children at the Wayne County Fair. In the interview, after being asked what he thought about the teacup ride at the fair, Ritter took the microphone from Ojeda. He proceeded to ramble about his excitement of being on television for the first time, frequently interjecting the word "apparently," from which his nickname, the "Apparently Kid," was derived. He eventually described his feelings about several rides at the fair, saying one made him "dizzy" and another "scared him half to death."

Ojeda interviewed Ritter on the opening day of the 152nd Wayne County Fair on August 1, 2014, and a snippet of the interview was aired on WNEP during that night's 10PM show. The full interview was subsequently posted to YouTube the following Monday, August 4, 2014, and it immediately went viral. The video had more than 300,000 views in less than 24 hours. It spread worldwide with reactions from Europe, South America, and the Middle East. In two days, the view count jumped to more than three million. In three days, it doubled to more than six million views.

His appearance spawned two popular hashtags—#NoahTheReporter and #ApparentlyKid—on social media platforms.

== Career ==
Within days of the original interview at the Wayne County Fair, Ritter was interviewed by numerous local and U.S. national news outlets. He appeared on the TODAY Show, and Good Morning America. He was interviewed by ABC correspondent Gio Benitez for ABC World News Tonight with Diane Sawyer.

A week later, Ritter's words were turned into an auto-tuned song by the Gregory Brothers on their YouTube Channel, Schmoyoho. The song's YouTube video now has more than 13 million views.

A month later, Ritter debuted in his first commercial for Freshpet pet food.

Ellen DeGeneres hosted Noah as a special guest more than a half dozen times on the 12th season her talk show, The Ellen DeGeneres Show. He had the opportunity to meet celebrities including Jim Carrey, Ariana Grande, Chris Pratt and Sofia Vergara.

In 2017, Ritter was a child-judge on the reality TV show The Toy Box. He was the only child-judge from Season 1 to also appear Season 2.

On August 4, 2024, WNEP-TV meteorologist and reporter Jeremy Lewan, conducted a follow-up interview of Ritter and his Grandpa Jack in the exact location at the Wayne County Fair he was interviewed exactly a decade earlier. Lewan rode the teacup ride with Ritter and his grandfather, and asked Ritter about his thoughts of the ride as a teenager. He said it was a "little less cramped" when he rode 10 years prior. The 10-year follow-up interview also went viral, with more than 2.8 million views on YouTube: WNEP's 3rd most popular video ever.

Ritter now frequently posts updates of his life, along with his Grandpa Jack on his YouTube channel, theapparentlykid1968.

In October 2026, Ritter appeared in Mozilla's Come Back to Firefox advertising campaign, alongside several other viral internet personalities from the 2000s and 2010s. The campaign used nostalgia for early internet culture to promote Firefox.

== Personal life ==
As a child, Noah had an affinity for dinosaurs, and aspired to become a paleontologist.

As of 2014, Ritter lived in Upper Pottsgrove Township, Pennsylvania, and later attended Pottsgrove High School, where he played on the Pottsgrove High School Boys Varsity Football team.
