= Mama Shu =

American CEO and activist

Mayor-elect of Highland Park
- Assuming office January 1, 2027
- Succeeding: Glenda McDonald

Personal details
- Born: Shamayim Harris; 1965 (age 60–61)
- Occupation: CEO
- Known for: Founder of Avalon Village
- Awards: Top Ten CNN Heroes, USA Today Woman of the Year
- Nickname: Mama Shu

Shamayim Harris (born 1965), better known by the nickname Mama Shu, is an American CEO and the founder of the Avalon Village, an eco-village in Highland Park, Michigan. Harris is the mayor-elect of Highland Park after defeating its incumbent in the 2026 mayoral race.

== Personal life ==
In 2007, Harris' two-year-old son, Jakobi Ra, was struck by a car in a hit and run accident while crossing the street with his older brother, Chinyelu. The following year Harris opened the Avalon Village in his honor, which included Jakobi Ra Park.

In 2015, her step-son, Pili Humphrey, died at age 34.

January 2021, Harris' 23-year-old son, Chinyelu Geb Kahero Humphrey, was shot and killed while sitting in his car in the Avalon Village, doing neighborhood watch . Harris heard the gunshots and saw two individuals at the scene. No arrests have been made for Chinyelu's murder, and Harris even went as far as purchasing a billboard in 2022 asking the community for help. The billboard featured an image of Chinyelu and read, “My son was killed. I saw who did it. I told the authorities. No arrests. Help me. Signed, Mama Shu." Harris stated that she had to fill out a police report twice because it got lost and that the crime scene was not treated appropriately.

Her nickname, "Mama Shu", is a reference to Shu, the Egyptian god of air.

== Life and work ==
Harris has held many roles in community activism and leadership . She was a school administrator in the Detroit Public Schools for 27 years, a chaplain for the Highland Park Police Department, chairwoman of Highland Park Charter Commission, Vice President of the Highland Park Housing Commission, President of the Highland Park Board of Education, Wayne Metro Regional Advisory Council, and was appointed by Gov. Gretchen Whitmer as a member of the Michigan Commission on Community Action and Economic Opportunity.

Harris also founded The Moon Ministry 501(c)(3) nonprofit religious organization. The Moon Ministry has no connection or affiliation with Hyung Jin Moon's Unification Church.

On November 3rd, 2026, Harris was elected mayor of Highland Park, defeating incumbent Glenda McDonald by 27 votes.

=== Avalon Village ===
Harris was motivated to develop the Avalon Village by the death of her son, Jakobi Ra. The eco-village is named after the street it sits on, Avalon Street, located in Highland Park, Michigan. Harris does not have a background in urban planning or development "except for sitting on this porch conjuring up what I want to do on this block, that's it".

The Avalon Village started after Harris purchased a house on the corner of Avalon Street for $3,000, which would be the first of 45 lots that were eventually acquired by Harris in her neighborhood of Highland Park, MI. Over the years, Harris acquired funding through many different avenues to help reach her goal of building the Avalon Village, including selling $5 fish sandwiches. The Avalon Village Kickstarter earned a massive $243,690 in donations. Harris was featured on The Ellen Show in 2016, where Ellen DeGeneres donated a $100,000 pre-fab house to the Avalon Village. The American rock band, Edward Sharpe and the Magnetic Zeros, donated $100,00 through their Big Sun Foundation non-profit. An anonymous donor and former Highland Park resident donated tens of thousands of dollars to help with the completion of the Homework House. On July 30, 2024, rap and hip-hop artist KRS-One performed a benefit show in Avalon Village at Jakobi Ra Park.

Harris commented while developing building of Avalon Village, “All I care about is how we, as our community, how we are going to uplift ourselves and empower ourselves. We’re just doing what we need to do, just to make things better for ourselves.”

==== Notable elements of Avalon Village ====
- The Village Hall is located inside a pre-fabricated Cocoon 9 home donated by Ellen Degeneres.
- The Goddess Marketplace is a storefront for women entrepreneurs to sell their goods.
- The Homework House is a learning space for youth where they can study, get tutoring, or attend learning activities. There is access to computers, 3D printers, a music studio, and a library. The space also contains a refrigerator and table for dining as well as a washer and dryer for youths to have access to food and clean clothing.
- The Imhotep STEAM Lab offers technology courses.
- Jakobi Ra Park features a mural of the Egyptian solar god, Ra, and the headstone for Harris' son, Jakobi.
- "My 3 Sunz" basketball court is dedicated to Harris' deceased sons, Jakobi, Pili, and Chinyelu.
- The Invincible Gardens are a memorial to Harris's son, Chinyelu, which contains a gazebo and flower garden.
- The community garden provides food for locals and teaches the youth how to garden.

Harris' future goals for Avalon Village include building a school, café, greenhouse, and a healing center.

== Recognition ==
- USA Today: Woman of the Year, 2024
- CNN Heroes: Top Ten, 2023
- Rainbow-Push Coalition: Let Freedom Ring Humanitarian Award, 2023
- Wayne Metropolitan Community Action Agency: Champion Award, 2019
- eWomen Network: Humanitarian of Year Award, 2016
