= Macey Hensley =

President Expert from Kansas

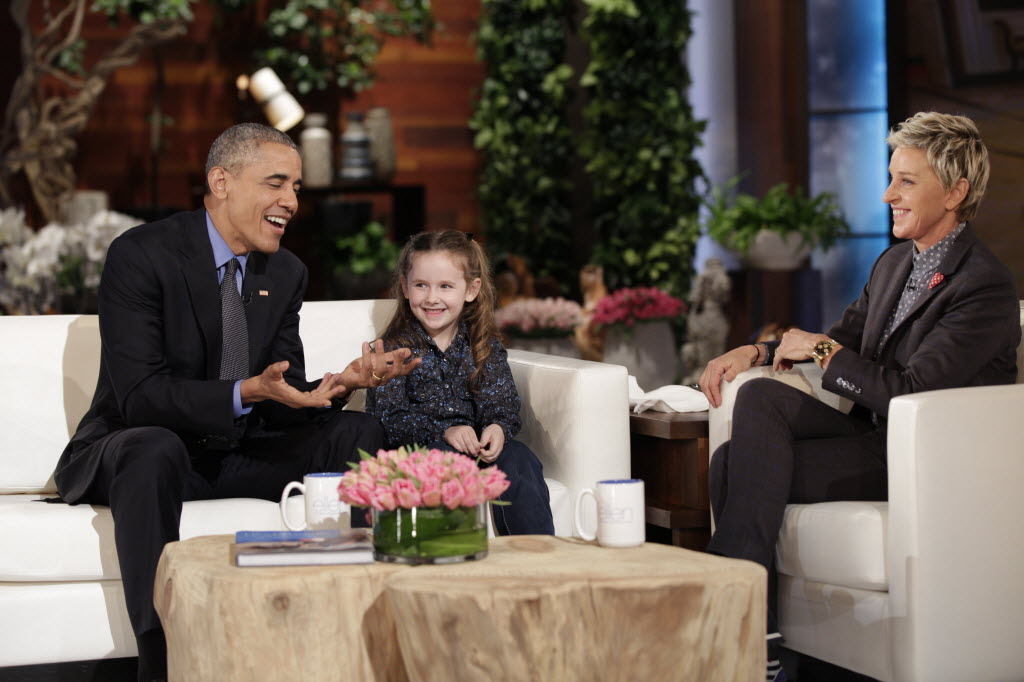
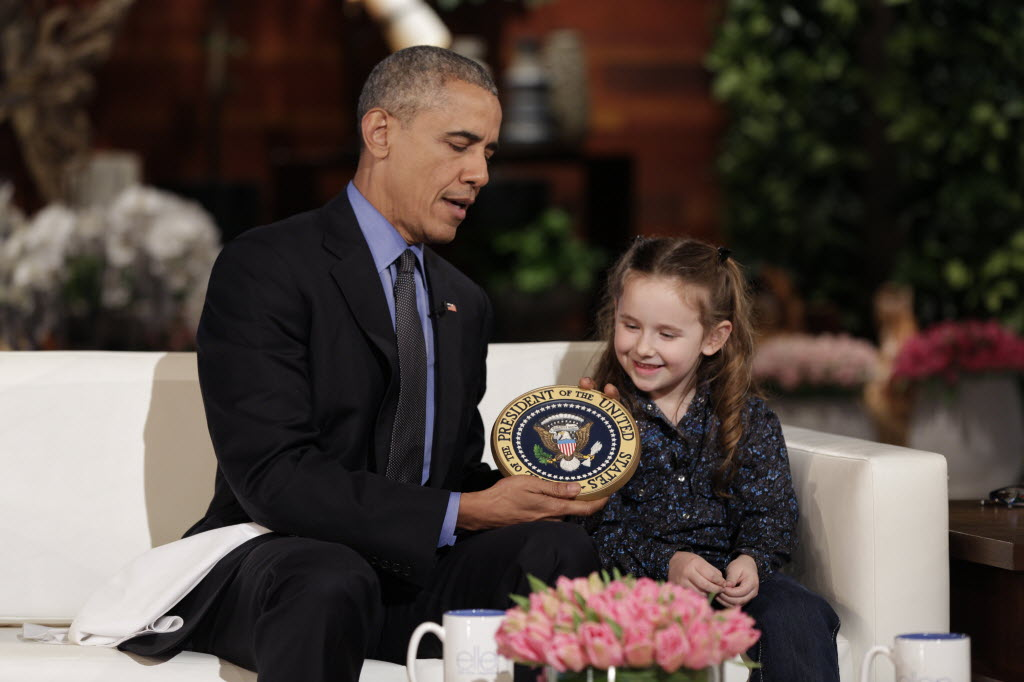
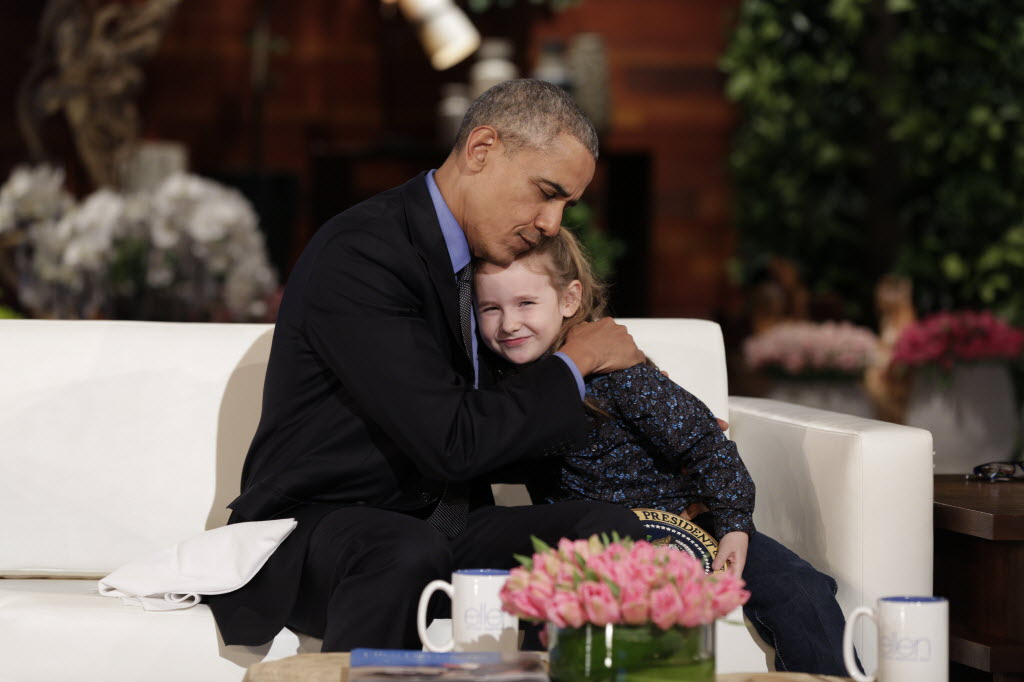

Macey Hensley (born December 21, 2009) is an American teenager who for over half-a-decade was the "Presidential Expert" on The Ellen DeGeneres Show. Her hometown of Council Grove, Kansas also named her their official Presidential Expert. The State of Kansas made her one of their official mascots for the tourism board, putting her into television advertisements for Kansas tourism.

== Biography ==
After an audition submission videotape by her mother, Ellen invited her to the show – where at the age of 5, she sang the names of every President of the United States, and informed Ellen that she wanted to be President one day. Almost instantly, she became an internet celebrity. Until the cancellation of Ellen's show, Ellen's show paid for her to visit over 22 states for tours on American history, including visits to the White House, The Hall of Presidents, the Presidential Libraries of Ronald Reagan, Jimmy Carter, George H. W. Bush, and others. She also visited a large American Civil War reenactment, with organizers hopeful that Ellen's exposure of the program would improve young peoples interest in history.

On the show, Hensley would often inform members of the public that she was a Presidential Candidate for the 2048 United States Presidential Election, and once campaigned for President while cold calling alongside Khloé Kardashian. Hensley painted a picture with George W. Bush after visiting his Presidential Library, received the Presidential Seal from Barack Obama, got a signed letter from Joe Biden during her White House tour, and began a large library collection of Presidential memorabilia. She toured the set of Hamilton: An American Musical while on a trip to Manhattan, and later sang with Lin-Manuel Miranda backstage.

In 2019, Hensley was sent by Ellen to become the show's correspondent at the fifth debate of the 2020 Democratic Party presidential primaries. There, she also tested the equipment for Kristen Welker by holding a mock debate on the debate stage.
