= Kevin Skinner =

American singer (born 1974)

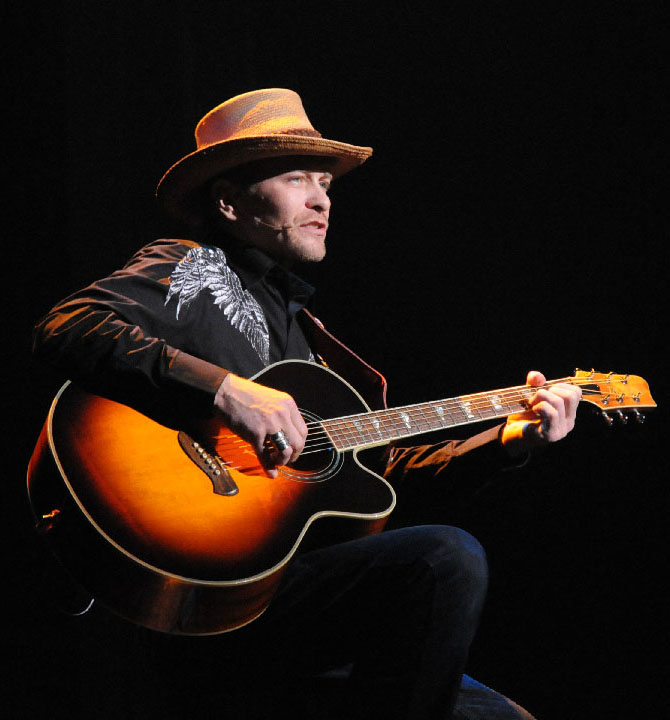
- Skinner performing in 2009

Background information
- Born: Patrick Kevin Skinner; February 25, 1974 (age 52); McCracken County, Kentucky
- Origin: Mayfield, Kentucky, US
- Genres: Country, country rock, pop, rock
- Occupations: Singer, songwriter, farmer
- Instruments: Vocals, guitar
- Years active: 2009-2012
- Label: Cypress Tree

Patrick Kevin Skinner (born February 25, 1974) is an American country music singer from the Jackson Purchase region of Kentucky. He is the winner of the fourth season of America's Got Talent.

== Early life and career ==
Skinner is from the Dublin community of Graves County, Kentucky, and started playing the guitar when he was 12 years old. He has been playing, writing, and singing ever since he learned the art of music from his musician father, Joe, who is a fan of Hank Williams. Skinner is divorced and has two children, a daughter and a son. He has worked as a chicken catcher for several years and claims to have caught with his friends up to 60,000 chickens in one night.

== America's Got Talent ==
=== Audition ===
Skinner performed in a live audition on the August 4, 2009 episode of America's Got Talent. He became a fan favorite in the show after his performance of Garth Brooks' "If Tomorrow Never Comes" while strumming his guitar. Judges Piers Morgan, Sharon Osbourne, and David Hasselhoff all voted "Yes", sending him to the Vegas Round.

=== Vegas Round ===
Skinner then appeared without performing in the Vegas Round. His audition was strong enough for the judges to send him to the Quarterfinals in Episode 411.

=== Quarterfinals ===
His Week 1 Quarterfinals performance in Episode 413 consisted of singing Bob Dylan's "Make You Feel My Love" while playing the guitar. Kevin received enough votes to be sent to the Semifinals in Episode 414 instead of Mosaic.

=== Semifinals ===
The Week 1 Semifinals performance in Episode 421 consisted of Skinner guitar playing and singing "Always On My Mind" by Brenda Lee. Piers Morgan gave him a standing ovation. In the end, Kevin received enough votes to be sent to the Finals in Episode 422 instead of Acrodunk basketball trampoline dance group.

=== Finals ===
Later in the Finals, Skinner's performance in Episode 425 consisted of singing his rendition of Aerosmith's "I Don't Want to Miss a Thing" while playing his guitar and having a backup band and vocals.

Judge Piers said the rendition wasn't perfect and had a missed an odd note with little flattened places, but described the moment as the point of Skinner's journey as a "rough diamond", needing professional training. Skinner judges once again received a standing ovations.

=== Finale ===
Kevin Skinner needed up in the Top 5 by voting in Episode 426 instead of Drew Stevyns. Kevin was revealed to have competed in first place in the competition that same night, in front of Barbara Padilla who was runner up, Recycled Percussion in third place, The Texas Tenors in fourth, and The Voices of Glory in fifth, winning one million dollars and a headline show in Las Vegas.

=== Trivia ===
During AGT's 10 Year Anniversary Special on July 29, 2015, Piers Morgan stated that Kevin Skinner was his favorite act.

=== Performances/results ===
Week	Theme	Song choice	Original artist	Performance order	Result
Audition	N/A	"If Tomorrow Never Comes"	Garth Brooks	N/A	Safe
Vegas Verdicts	Male Singers	N/A	N/A	N/A	Safe
Top 48	Group 1	"Make You Feel My Love"	Bob Dylan	11	Safe
Top 20	Group 1	"Always on My Mind"	Brenda Lee	10	Safe
Top 10	N/A	"I Don't Wanna Miss a Thing"	Aerosmith	9	Winner

=== Post-Talent ===
Kevin received the $1 million prize, which was put into an annuity so it will be paid out over 40 years, and a headline show in Las Vegas, premiering in October 2009 and hosted by Jerry Springer. He performed "If Tomorrow Never Comes" on The Tonight Show with Conan O'Brien on September 17, 2009, and in October of that year, he performed on The Ellen DeGeneres Show and later on Live with Kelly and Ryan.

== Career ==
=== Long Ride (2010–present) ===
His debut CD, "Long Ride" was released on his namesake Saint Patrick's Day, March 17, 2010. The album was released online six months later on September 14.

== Discography ==
=== Albums ===
Year	Album	Peak positions	
Year	Album	US Country	US
2010	Long Ride: Release: US: March 17, 2010 iTunes: September 14, 2010; Label: Cypress Tree	—	—
2011	Kevin Skinner: Live And Unplugged: Release: US: May 30, 2011	—	—
"—" denotes the album did not chart.

=== Singles ===
Year	Single	Album
2010	"Like It's the Last Goodbye"	Long Ride

=== Music videos ===
Year	Video	Director
2010	"Like It's the Last Goodbye"	John Lloyd Miller

Preceded by Neal E. Boyd	America's Got Talent winner Season 4 (Summer 2009)	Succeeded by Michael Grimm
