= Grandma Lee =

American comedian (1934–2020)

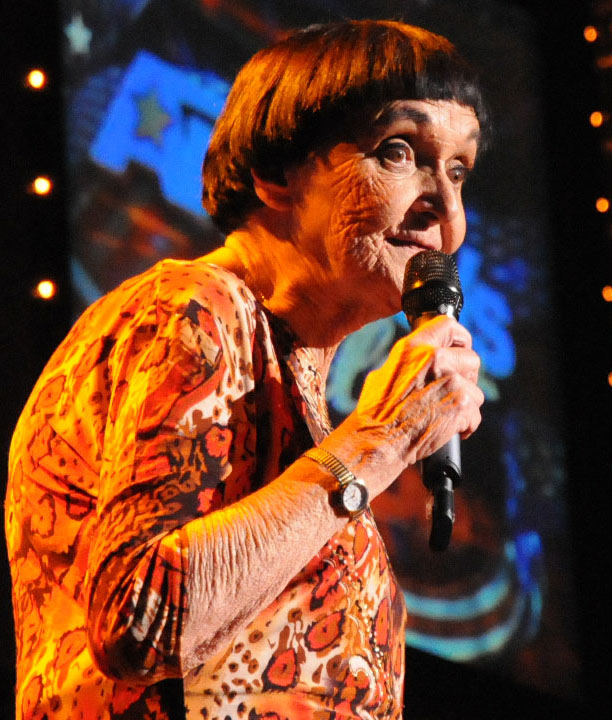
- Grandma Lee performing in 2009
- Born: Frances Lee Myers; May 29, 1934; Oklahoma City, Oklahoma, U.S.
- Died: April 24, 2020 (aged 85); Jacksonville, Florida, U.S.
- Education: Otterbein University
- Spouse: Ben Strong (m. 1958; died 1995)
- Children: 4

Comedy career
- Years active: 1997–2020
- Medium: Stand-up comedy

Frances Lee Strong (née Myers; May 29, 1934 – April 24, 2020), better known by her stage name Grandma Lee, was an American stand-up comedian who was a talent show contestant on America's Got Talent in 2009. She began performing when she was in her 60s and became known for her off-color humor.

== Early life ==
Frances Lee Myers was born in Oklahoma City, Oklahoma, and grew up in Cape Girardeau, Missouri, where her father was a college dean. After he died when she was 12, the family fell apart, and she eventually landed in a children's home in Kentucky. In 1956, she graduated with a degree in English education from Otterbein University in Ohio.

== Career ==
After college in 1958, Myers married a career U.S. Marine, Ben Strong. The couple moved around the world as he fulfilled his military duties, raising four children. She taught for a semester before realizing the profession was not for her. While living in Cleveland in the late 1950s, she worked as a newspaper reporter at the Cleveland Press.

Lee Strong and her husband were living in Homestead, Florida, in 1992 when Hurricane Andrew destroyed their home. They moved to Jacksonville, where Ben died of cancer in 1995. They had been married for 37 years. Strong later took a buyout from BellSouth, where she was working as a phone operator.

Strong began doing stand-up comedy in 1997, performing at open mic nights at The Comedy Zone in Jacksonville. In Tampa in 2004, she reached the final rounds of auditions for Last Comic Standing.

In 2009, Strong rose to prominence as a contestant on the fourth season of the reality series America's Got Talent, when she advanced to the final round. She amused audiences with her distinctive raunchy Southern humor. She also flirted with judges Piers Morgan and David Hasselhoff. One of ten finalists, Strong was not selected for the final five during the two-hour finale. She told People, "[My] material is based on the truth. I go up there and wing it… but I had to clean it up for the show. I won’t say a cuss word or anything to jeopardize [myself]. I can do clean or edgy."

== Death ==
Strong died at age 85 on April 24, 2020, at an assisted living facility in Jacksonville.
