= Acrodunk =

Acrodunk is a basketball performance squad founded by Jerry L. Burrell in 1994. Acrodunk started out as The High "Impact" Squad with members of Acrodunk still performing for The High "Impact" Squad. Acrodunk is also formerly known as Team Acrodunk. Acrodunk's primary mission is to inspire and impress audiences with variations of the slam dunk. The group performs shows for college and professional basketball games, corporate meetings, festivals, fairs, theme parks, TV shows and schools. The squad made an appearance twice on the television show America's Got Talent. Members of Acrodunk have set numerous Guinness World Records individually and as a team and the team performs worldwide.

== Team members ==
Each player has a nickname that they are known by during shows:

- Jerry L. Burrell (JB)
- Gregory L. Mueller (G-Man)
- Gregory T. Jerralds (GT)
- Jason Skillern (J-Skillz)
- Mattew Marzo (M&M)
- Anthony J. Grant (Ninja)
- Eddie Ray Johnson III (Easy Eddie)
- Jesus El (Zeus)
- Elijah S. Price (Showtime)
- Joshua Tomas Rasile (3D)
- Devin Alexander (Spidey)
- Timothy Muscarella (Jerzee)

== Performances and results ==
Acrodunk has performed in the television show America's Got Talent.

America's Got Talent, season 4

Week	Theme	Song choice	Original artist	Performance order	Result
Audition	N/A	"Boom Boom Pow"	Black Eyed Peas	N/A	Safe
Vegas Verdicts	N/A	N/A	N/A	N/A	Safe
Top 48	Street	"Jump"	Flo Rida	8	Safe
Top 20	Fire	"Let It Rock"	Kevin Rudolf	1	Eliminated

== See also ==
- America's Got Talent Season 4
