= Bárbara Padilla =

Mexican-American operatic soprano (born 1973)

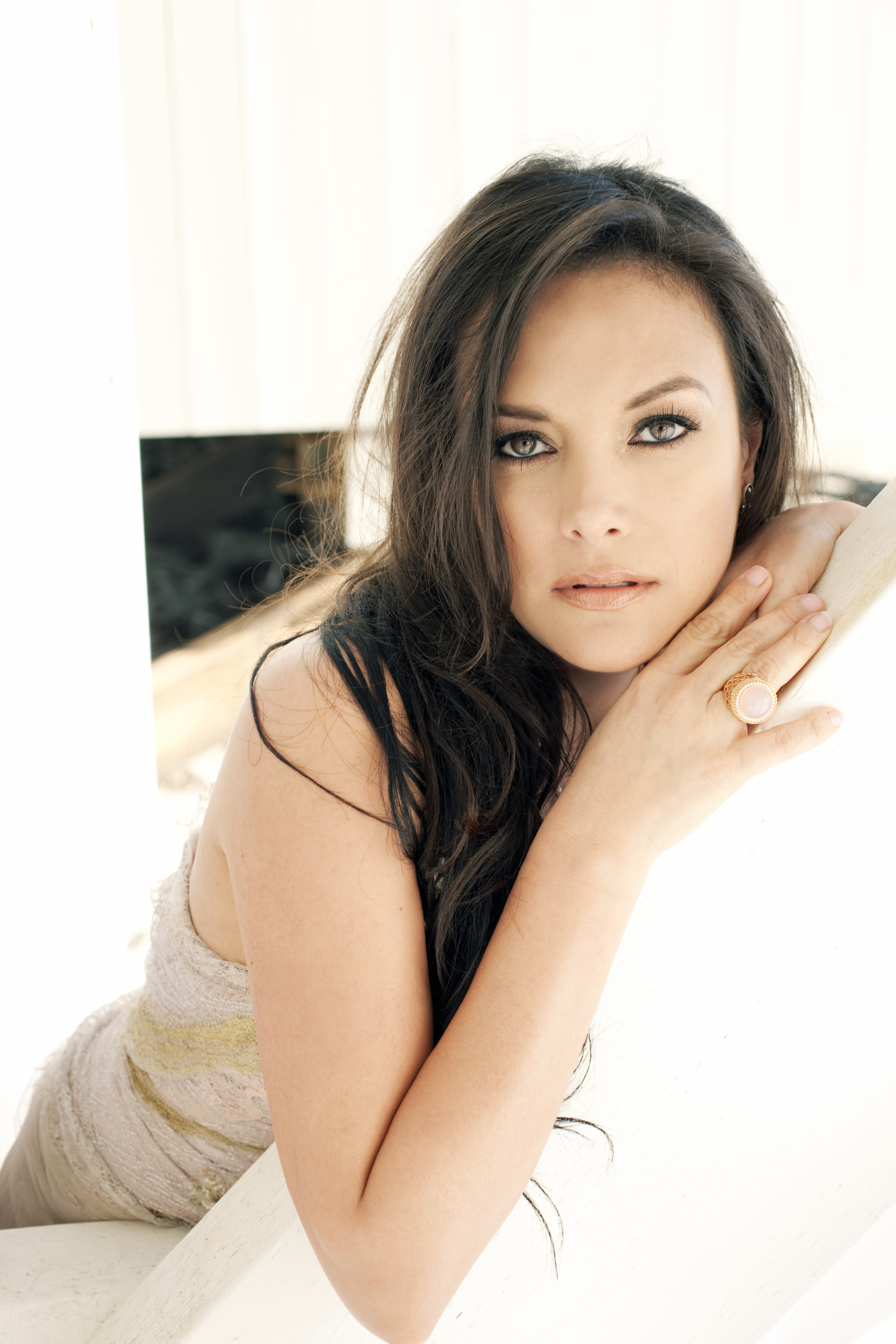
Barbara Padilla, America's Got Talent 1st Runner Up, Opera Singer

Bárbara Padilla (/pəˈdiːə/; born December 9, 1973) is a Mexican-American operatic soprano. She was the runner-up on the fourth season of America's Got Talent. She is well known as a survivor of Hodgkin's lymphoma.

== Personal life ==
Bárbara Padilla was born in Guadalajara, Mexico where she studied music, acting, and dance.

=== Health ===
During her undergraduate studies, Padilla was diagnosed with Hodgkin lymphoma and underwent several rounds of chemotherapy and radiation. During this time, Padilla was told that she might never be able to sing again because the radiation could harm her vocal cords.

After traveling to Houston for a consultation with doctors, Padilla had the chance to audition for the Moores School of Music at the University of Houston. She was awarded a full scholarship where she completed the master's degree program, all while battling cancer. Padilla is in remission, living in New York with her husband.

=== Accomplishments ===
Padilla's accomplishments while at UH include first-place winner in NATS competition in 2001 in the advanced adults category and participated in the summer program IIVArts held in Chiari, Italy. She was invited to sing the American and Mexican National Anthems for the sold-out, historic soccer game at Reliant Stadium. She also performed as a soloist of many symphonic events, including oratorio and concerts in USA, Italy and Mexico.

Her repertoire includes operas like La bohème, Turandot, Tosca, Madame Butterfly, and La traviata. She released her first CD in 2014.

== America's Got Talent ==
=== Overview ===
Padilla auditioned on America's Got Talent, singing "O Mio Babbino Caro". She then advanced to the Vegas Verdicts, where she then moved on to the Top 48. During the quarterfinals, she sang "Time to Say Goodbye" by Andrea Bocelli, with the judges stating she's the leader of the night. She then advanced to the semifinals, singing "Ave Maria". One of the judges claimed it was the best vocal performance in the history of the show, and she was clearly one of the favorites. During the finals, she sang the same song from her audition. She finished as runner-up, losing to country singer Kevin Skinner.

=== Performances/Results ===
Week	Song choice	Original artist	Performance order	Result
Audition	"O mio babbino caro"	Florence Easton	N/A	Advanced
Vegas Verdicts	N/A	N/A	N/A	Advanced
Top 48; Group 4	"Time to Say Goodbye"	Andrea Bocelli	2	Advanced
Top 20; Group 2	"Ave Maria"	Charles-François Gounod	10	Advanced
Top 10	"O mio babbino caro"	Florence Easton	4	2nd Place

== Career ==
After finishing as the runner up, Barbara performed in the America's Got Talent Live concert. Her self-titled debut album was released in late 2014.
