= The Texas Tenors =

Trio vocal group

- Origin: United States
- Genres: Classical crossover, country, Classical, Adult Contemporary, Pop, Holiday, Americana
- Years active: 2009–present
- Label: The Texas Tenors
- Members: Marcus Collins; JC Fisher; John Hagen
- Website: thetexastenors.com

The Texas Tenors are a three-time Emmy Award-winning classical crossover, trio vocal group formed in 2009 by country singer JC Fisher, pop singer Marcus Collins and opera singer John Hagen. They were a top four finalist in the fourth season of America's Got Talent, making them the highest ranking vocal group in the show's history.

In 2013, The trio filmed their first PBS special with The Phoenix Symphony, performing songs from their second album, You Should Dream. Along with being one of only two acts from America's Got Talent (The Texas Tenors and Jackie Evancho) to star in their own television special for PBS, The Texas Tenors achieved another milestone in 2014 when they were honored with five Emmy Awards nominations and three wins for the self-produced special. The group also supports many charitable organizations.

The group has performed more than 2000 concerts in over 20 countries including Great Britain and China. In August 2017, The Texas Tenors premiered their second PBS special and on September 8, 2017, released their third studio album of the same name, Rise, which debuted at #1 on the Billboard Classical Albums Chart, #1 Heatseeker New Artist Chart and #22 Top Current Albums resulting in the group's highest charting positions and most successful sales week ever.

In 2018, the trio released A Collection of Broadway & American Classics exclusively at their live concerts and through their website at the request of their fan club. Without distribution or a national campaign, the album debuted at #1 on the Billboard Classical Albums Chart and spent 10 weeks in the top 10.

== Career ==
=== America's Got Talent (2009) ===
The trio auditioned for America's Got Talent season four, performing a crossover version of "Mountain Music". They advanced week after week, finishing in fourth place.

==== Performances/Results ====
Week	Theme	Song choice	Original artist	Performance order	Result
Audition	N/A	"Mountain Music"	Alabama	N/A	Advanced
Top 40; Group 2	N/A	"God Bless the U.S.A."	Lee Greenwood	N/A	Advanced
Top 20; Group 1	N/A	"Unchained Melody"	The Righteous Brothers	N/A	Advanced
Top 10	N/A	"My Way"	Frank Sinatra	N/A	4th Place

=== After America's Got Talent ===
The group's self-titled debut album, The Texas Tenors, was released in 2009. The album contained all four songs that were performed on America's Got Talent, some arias such as "Nessun dorma" and "La donna è mobile" as well as other songs. In 2011, the group remastered the album and included some new material. The album has sold 225,000 units to date.

Their second studio album, You Should Dream, was released on December 10, 2013. Produced by Academy Award and Grammy nominated producer Nigel Wright, You Should Dream features "God Bless the USA", "Unchained Melody", The Rolling Stones' "Wild Horses", two original songs and a 65 piece orchestra.

The Texas Tenors are one of only two acts from America's Got Talent to star in their own television special for PBS, the group achieved a milestone in 2014 when they were honored with five Emmy Awards nominations and three wins.

In 2017, The Texas Tenors' third studio album, Rise, debuted at #1 on the Classical Albums Chart and #5 on the Top Country Albums Chart resulting in the most successful week of sales for the group and their highest charting positions to date.

=== America's Got Talent: The Champions (2019) ===
In 2019, The Texas Tenors competed on America's Got Talent: The Champions. Their performance consisted of singing "Unchained Melody" as a trio and in the end, was acclaimed by the judges and the audience.

== Discography ==
=== Studio albums ===
Title	Album details	Peak chart positions										Sales
Title	Album details	US	US Classical	US Classical Crossover	US Country	US Heat	US Indie	US Holiday	US Top Album Sales	US Internet	US Classical Catalog	Sales
The Texas Tenors	Release date: June 15, 2009; Label: The Texas Tenors											US: 180,000
Country Roots: Classical Sound (The Texas Tenors remastered)	Release date: November 10, 2011; Label: The Texas Tenors										4	US: 225,000
O Night Divine	Release date: November 16, 2013; Label: The Texas Tenors	—	22	14	—	—	—	33	—	—	3	US: 290,000
You Should Dream	Release date: December 10, 2013; Label: The Texas Tenors; Distribution: Select-O-Hits	—	5	3	39	3	41	—	199	—	2	
Rise	Release date: September 8, 2017; Label: The Texas Tenors; Distribution: Select-O-Hits	111	1	1	17	1	8	—	22	6	1	
Outside The Lines	Release date: May 7, 2021; Label: The Texas Tenors; Distribution: Select-O-Hits		3	1			25		116			
"—" denotes releases that did not chart

=== Live albums ===
Title	Album details	Peak chart positions				
Title	Album details	US Classical	US Classical Crossover	US Country	US Heat	US Classical Catalog
The Texas Tenors Unplugged: Live from Larry's Country Diner	Release date: August 10, 2013; Label: The Texas Tenors	—	—	—		
The First 5 years Live	Release date: November 6, 2014; Label: The Texas Tenors	11	6	—	5	1
A Collection of Broadway & American Classics	Release date: August 3, 2018; Label: The Texas Tenors	1	1		13	
"—" denotes releases that did not chart

=== Singles ===
Year	Single	Peak chart positions			Album
Year	Single	US Classical Digital	US Hot Singles Sales	US AC Indicator	Album
2013	"God Bless the U.S.A."	16	-	-	You Should Dream
2013	"The Star-Spangled Banner"	-	-	-	n/a
2015	"Ruckus on the Ranch"	-	9	-	Ruckus on the Ranch maxi single
2016	"Favorite Time of Year"	-	13	-	n/a
2017	"Rise"	-	-	22	Rise
2017	"Bootdaddy"	-	-	42	Rise
"—" denotes releases that did not chart

== Video: Filmed Concerts and Events ==
Year	Title	Presentation	Peak Chart Position	Content
Year	Title	Presentation	US Music Video Sales Chart	Content
2011	Live in Concert	*DVD * Concert	-	*Place: The Starlite Theatre in Branson, MO; *Date: June, 2011; *DVD. Live performance. "Mountain Music", "Rocky Top", "Somewhere", "My Way"
2013	You Should Dream	* DVD; *Blu-ray * Concert	9	*Place: Grand Canyon University in Phoenix, AZ; *Date: 10 April 2013; *Awards : 3 Emmy Award wins, 5 Emmy Award nominations *DVD. Live performance, orchestra, choir, PBS presentation "o sole mio", "Wild Horses", "Unchained Melody", "God Bless the USA" Bonus Features: Interviews, bonus songs, unreleased material
2017	Rise	* DVD; *4K resolution *Blu-ray * Concert	2	*Place: Grand 1894 Opera House in Galveston, TX; *Date: 9 August 2016; *DVD. Live performance, orchestra, choir, PBS presentation "Rise", "Bootdaddy", "Desperado", "Writing's on the Wall" from Spectre, "Music of the Night", Selections from Les Misérables featuring "Bring Him Home", "I Dreamed a Dream" Bonus Features: Outtakes, bonus songs, unreleased material
2017	Deep in the Heart of Christmas	*DVD * Concert	18	*Place: The Starlite Theatre in Branson, MO; *Date: November, 2016; *DVD. Live performance, Christmas featuring aerialist, dancers and choir "Mary Did You Know", "Believe" from Polar Express, "Joy to the World", "Last Christmas" Bonus Features: Outtakes, Interviews, extras songs, behind the scenes
"—" denotes releases that did not chart
