= America's Got Talent season 4 =

America's Got Talent
- Season 4
- Showrunner: Jason Raff
- Hosted by: Nick Cannon
- Judges: Piers Morgan; Sharon Osbourne; David Hasselhoff
- Winner: Kevin Skinner
- Runner-up: Bárbara Padilla
- Finals venue: CBS Television City
- No. of episodes: 26

Release
- Original network: NBC
- Original release: June 23 – September 16, 2009

Season chronology
- ← Previous; Season 3 Next → Season 5

Judges and Host for America's Got Talent Season 4

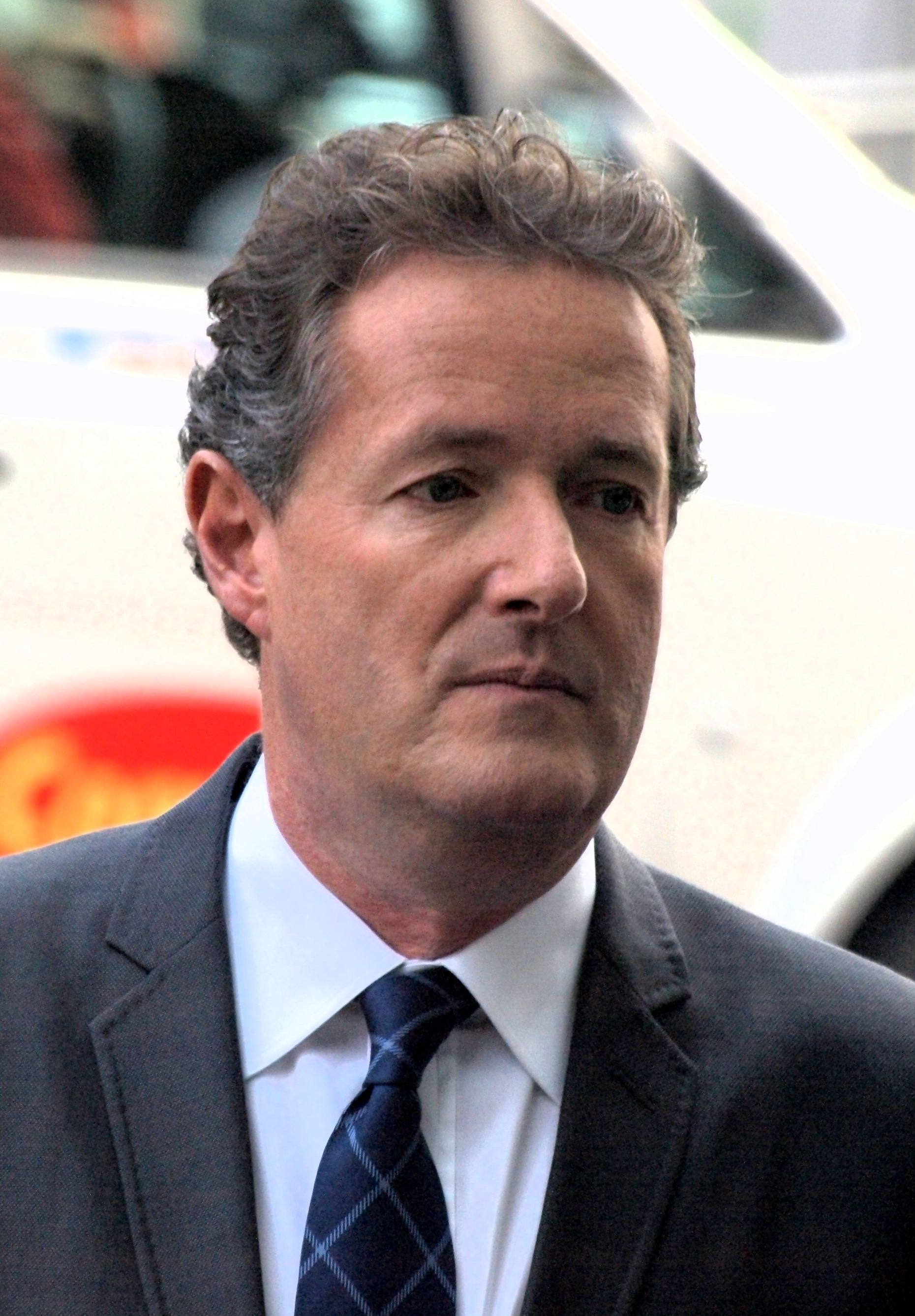
Piers Morgan

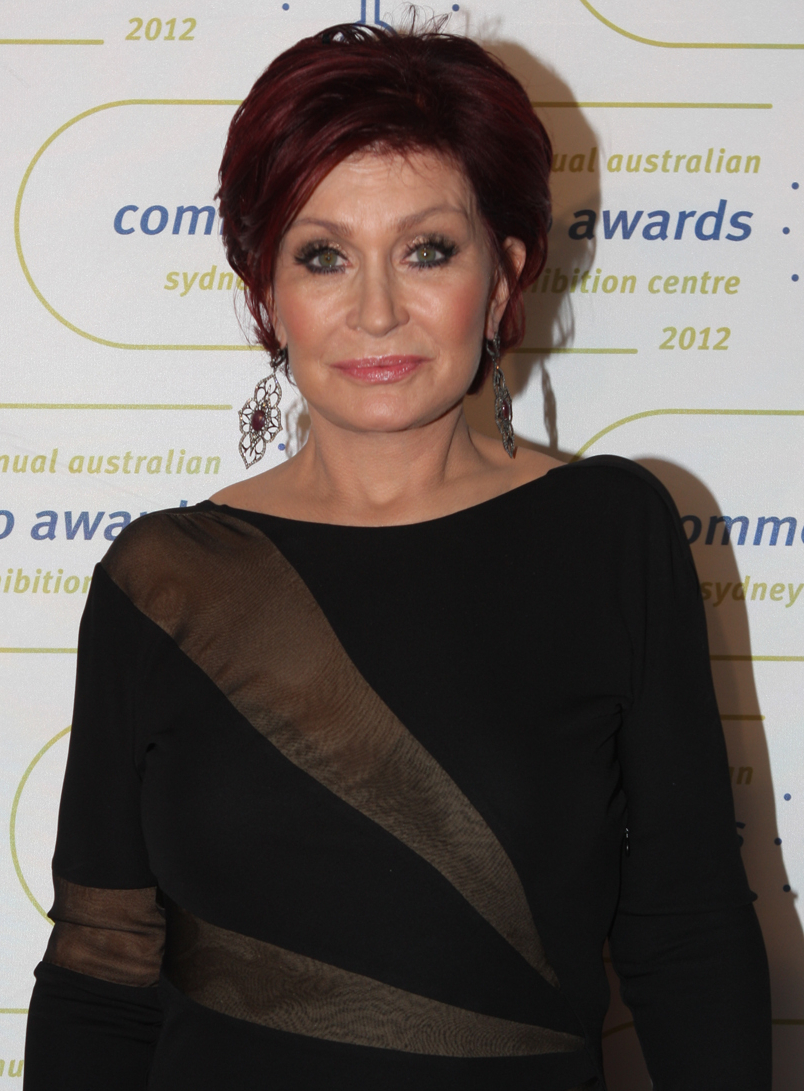
Sharon Osbourne

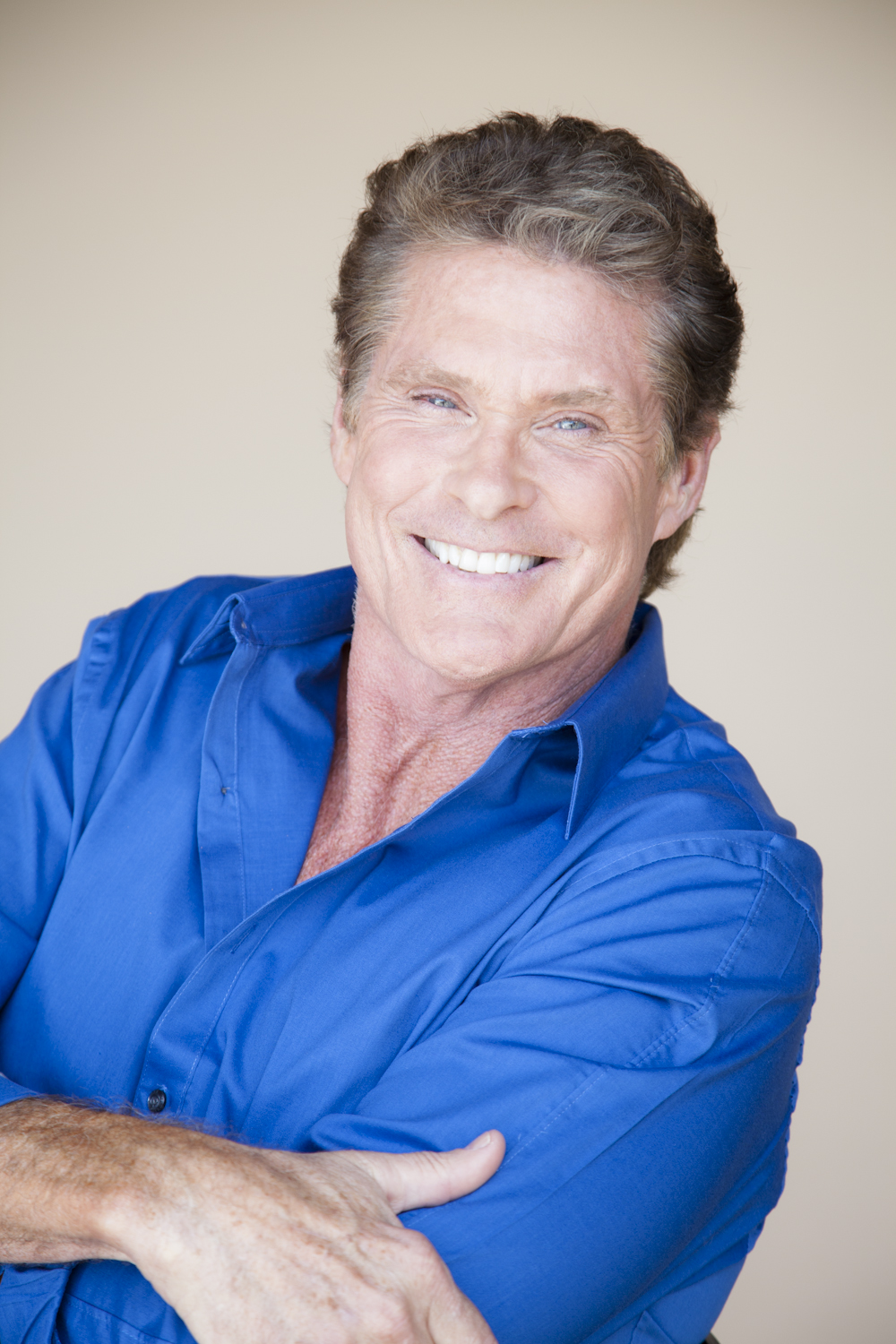
David Hasselhoff

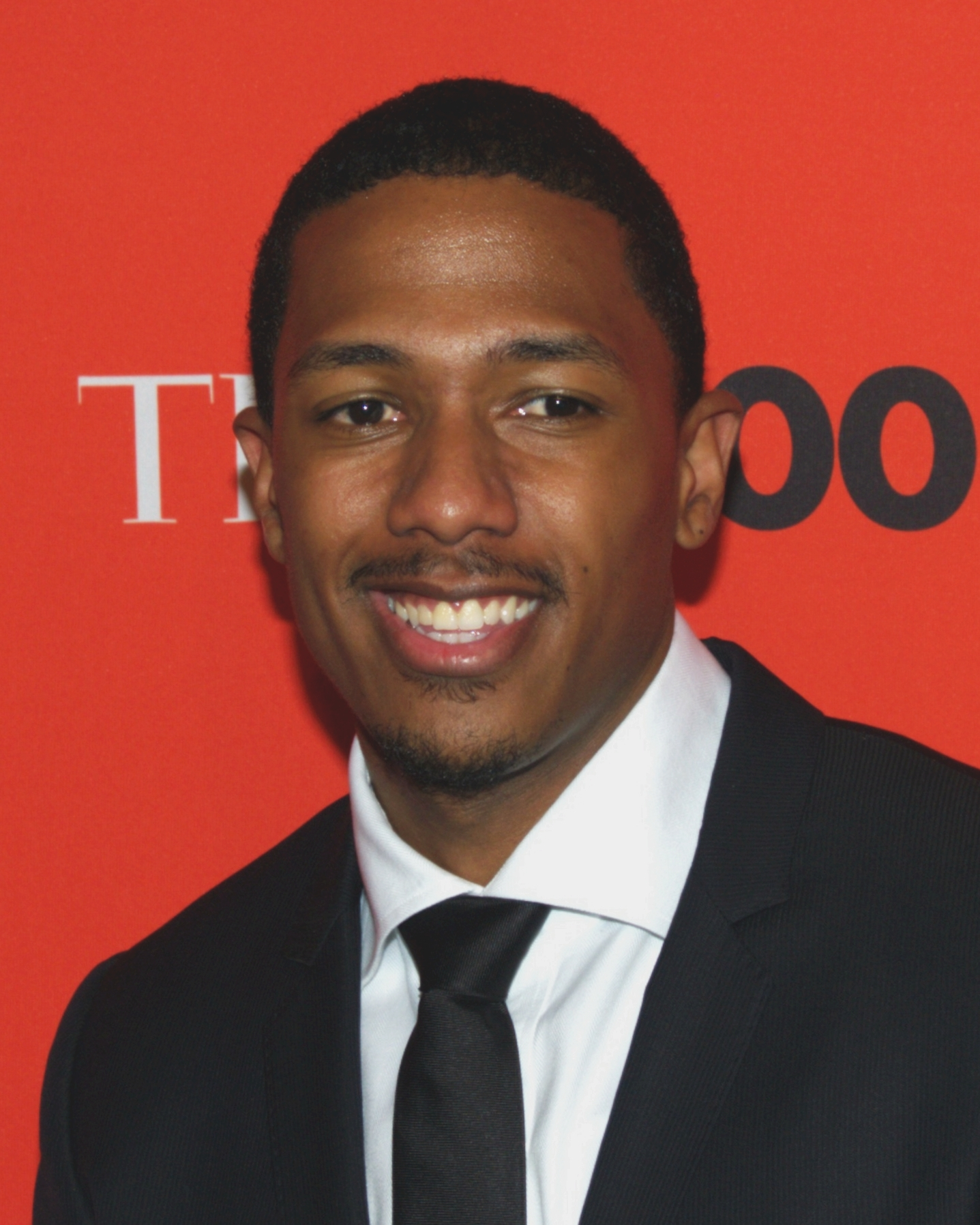
Nick Cannon

The fourth season of American talent show competition series America's Got Talent was broadcast on NBC from June 23 to September 16, 2009. Following the previous season, Jerry Springer left the show due to other commitments, and was replaced as host by Nick Cannon. A number of changes were also made to the program before filming commenced, which included replacing the "boot camp" stage with a round similar in format to that used by Britain's Got Talent, and changing the buzzer format to match that being used by the Got Talent franchise. In addition, the episodes for results in each live round of the competition were also modified. They were broadcast over a one-hour period, and would feature performances by guest stars.

The fourth season was won by country singer Kevin Skinner, with opera singer Bárbara Padilla finishing in second, and percussion group Recycled Percussion placing third. During its broadcast, the season averaged around over 11.9 million viewers, and was the first in the program's history to be aired in high definition.

== Season overview ==
Auditions for the fourth season's competition took place across Winter until mid-Spring 2009, with auditions expanding to more cities. Filming for the audition episodes focused on those held in the cities of New York, Houston, Los Angeles, Chicago, Miami, Tacoma, and Seattle. Auditions were also held in Boston, Atlanta, and Washington, D.C. but were not included in the televised episodes. Prior to auditions taking place, Jerry Springer announced he was unable to continue hosting AGT due to his talk show schedule, in addition to summer theater commitments he had. As a result, the network recruited Nick Cannon to be his successor.

The format for the second stage of auditions changed by removing the "boot camp" portion that had been used in the previous two seasons, in favor of using the selection process from Britain's Got Talent, under the title of "Vegas Verdicts". Instead, judges reviewed the tapes of participants who had made successful auditions, to determine who would advance into the live rounds. This stage would continue to divide participants into groups, allowing the judges to debate among themselves about which group of participants should earn a place in the live rounds, before bringing back each group to inform them of their decision about their progress in the competition. In some cases, participants were required to do a second performance to help the judges make their final decisions. The format for the buzzers in the live rounds was also altered to match that of the format across the Got Talent franchise, in that participants receiving buzzes from all the judges had to stop immediately, rather than being given a little more time to perform.

Two issues arose during this season during the competition. The first was the intervention of executive producer Simon Cowell, who felt "too much talent" had been eliminated during the new "Vegas Verdicts" stage. The judges decided to bring back several of the eliminated acts as Wildcards for the quarter-finals. The second was the judges' inability to determine which two acts they favored and would advance beyond the first semi-final. Eventually they opted to put both through without a vote in the second semi-final.

Forty-eight of the participants who auditioned for the season secured a place in the live quarter-finals (including those originally eliminated in the Vegas Verdicts stage before Cowell's intervention), with twelve quarter-finalists performing in each show. About twenty of these advanced and were split between the two semi-finals, with ten semi-finalists securing a place in the live final, which was a single stage rather than multiple rounds in previous seasons. Here are the results of each participant's overall performance during the season:

Winner | Runner-up | Third place | Finalist | Semi-finalist
Quarter-finalist | Judges' Wildcard Quarter-Finalist

Participant	Age(s) ^{1}	Genre	Act	From	Quarter-Final	Result
African High Flyers	24-35	Acrobatics	Acrobatic Group	Orlando	4	Eliminated
Alizma	23	Singing / Music	Violin Trio	Las Vegas	2	Eliminated
Anthony & Matt	24 & 22	Singing / Dance	Singer & Tap Dancer	New York City	4	Eliminated
Arcadian Broad	13	Dance	Dancer	Orlando	1	Semi-finalist
Bárbara Padilla	36	Singing	Opera Singer	Houston	4	Runner-up
Beale Street Flippers	20-26	Acrobatics	Acrobat Group	Memphis, Tennessee	2	Eliminated
Breaksk8	21-30	Dance	Dance Group	Kokomo, Indiana	1	Eliminated
BRI	17	Singing / Music	Singer & Pianist	Las Vegas	3	Eliminated
Carol Loo	63	Dance	Dancer	Jersey City, New Jersey	2	Eliminated
Charles DeWayne	21	Singing / Music	Singer & Pianist	La Verne, California	2	Eliminated
Coney Island Chris	42	Danger / Comedy	Sideshow Performer	Naugatuck, Connecticut	4	Eliminated
Dave Johnson	30	Singing / Comedy	Comedy Singer	Renton, Washington	3	Eliminated
Diva League	20-44	Dance	Dance Group	Washington, D.C.	1	Eliminated
Drew Stevyns	26	Singing / Music	Singer & Guitarist	Sykesville, Maryland	4	Finalist
Drew Thomas Magic & Illusion	40 ^{2}	Magic	Magician	Orlando	1	Semi-finalist
Eleisha Miller	8	Singing / Music	Singer & Pianist	Amarillo, Texas	2	Eliminated
EriAm Sisters	11-16	Singing	Vocal Trio	Seattle	4	Semi-finalist
Erik & Rickie	8	Dance	Ballroom Duo	Seattle	4	Semi-finalist
Fab Five	24-35	Dance	Clogging Group	Morgan, Utah	2	Finalist
FootworKINGz	16-24	Dance	Dance Group	Chicago	3	Semi-finalist
G Force	8-11	Singing / Music	Band	Amherst, Ohio	3	Eliminated
Grandma Lee	75	Comedy	Comedian	Jacksonville, Florida	1	Finalist
Hairo Torres	23	Dance / Acrobatics	Contortionist Dancer	Grants Pass, Oregon	3	Finalist
Ishaara	18–23	Dance	Dance Group	Berkeley, California	4	Eliminated
Jay Mattioli	27	Magic	Magician	Manassas, Virginia	3	Eliminated
Jeffrey Ou	18	Music	Pianist	Carrollton, Texas	3	Semi-finalist
Kevin Skinner	35	Singing / Music	Singer & Guitarist	Mayfield, Kentucky	1	Winner
Lake Houston Dance	9-14	Dance	Dance Group	Houston	1	Eliminated
Lawrence Beamen	34	Singing	Singer	Walnut Creek, California	3	Finalist
Manuela Horn	36	Music	Yodeller	Seattle	1	Eliminated
Marcus Terrell & The Serenades	22-28	Singing	Vocal Group	Kansas City, Missouri	3	Eliminated
Mario & Jenny	34 & 33	Variety	Juggling Duo	Las Vegas	3	Semi-finalist
Mia Boostrom	16	Singing / Music	Singer & Pianist	North Dighton, Massachusetts	4	Eliminated
Mosaic	30-34	Singing	A Cappella Group	Las Vegas	1	Eliminated
Pam Martin's Top Dog	54 & 6	Animal	Dog Act	Garland, Texas	4	Eliminated
Paradizo Dance	29 & 37	Acrobatics	Acrobatic Duo	New York City	2	Semi-finalist
Pete Peterkin	54	Comedy	Impressionist	New York City	2	Eliminated
Pixie Mystère	9-11	Dance / Acrobatics	Contortionist Dance Group	Cape May, New Jersey	3	Eliminated
Platt Brothers	22-27	Acrobatics	Acrobat Trio	San Diego, California	1	Eliminated
Recycled Percussion	22-39	Music	Percussion Group	Goffstown, New Hampshire	4	Third place
SQ Entertainment	19-32	Dance	Dance Group	Boston	2	Eliminated
Team Acrodunk	23-45	Acrobatics	Basketball Stunt Team	Houston	1	Semi-finalist
The Lollipop Girls	24-40	Dance	Dance Group	San Diego	4	Eliminated
The Texas Tenors	34-44	Singing	Vocal Trio	Houston	2	Finalist
The Voices of Glory	9-16	Singing	Vocal Trio	Highland, New York	2	Finalist
Thia Megia	14	Singing	Singer	Redwood City, California	1	Eliminated
Tony Hoard & Rory	54 & 7	Animal	Dog Act	New Castle, Indiana	2	Semi-finalist
U4ria Dance Crew	16-23	Dance	Dance Group	Coral Springs, Florida	3	Eliminated

- ^1 Ages denoted for a participant(s), pertain to their final performance for this season.
- ^2 The ages of Drew Thomas' assistants and Marcus Terrell's backing group were not disclosed during the season's broadcast.

=== Quarter-finals summary ===
Buzzed Out | Judges' choice | Advanced to Semi-finals
Won Judges' Vote | Lost Judges' Vote

==== Quarter-final 1 (August 4) ====
Guest Performers, Results Show: Terry Fator and Mariah Carey

Quarter-Finalist	Order	Buzzes and Judges' Vote			Result (August 5)
Quarter-Finalist	Order	Hasselhoff	Osbourne	Morgan	Result (August 5)
Breaksk8	1				Eliminated
Thia Megia	2				Lost Judges' Vote
Platt Brothers	3				Eliminated
Diva League	4				Eliminated
Manuela Horn	5				Eliminated
Grandma Lee	6				Advanced
Mosaic	7				Eliminated
Team Acrodunk	8				Advanced
Arcadian Broad	9				Won Judges' Vote
Drew Thomas Magic & Illusions	10				Advanced
Kevin Skinner	11				Advanced
Lake Houston Dance	12				Eliminated

==== Quarter-final 2 (August 11) ====
Guest Performers, Results Show: LMFAO and Penn and Teller.

Quarter-Finalist	Order	Buzzes and Judges' Vote			Result (August 12)
Quarter-Finalist	Order	Hasselhoff	Osbourne	Morgan	Result (August 12)
Fab Five	1				Advanced
Charles DeWayne	2				Lost Judges' Vote
Carol Loo	3				Eliminated
Tony Hoard & Rory	4				Won Judges' Vote
Eleisha Miller	5				Eliminated
Paradizo Dance	6				Advanced
The Texas Tenors	7				Advanced
SQ Entertainment	8				Eliminated
Pete Peterkin	9				Eliminated
Alizma	10				Eliminated
Beale Street Flippers	11				Eliminated
The Voices of Glory	12				Advanced

==== Quarter-final 3 (August 18) ====
Guest Performers, Results Show: Ashley Tisdale and Daughtry

Quarter-Finalist	Order	Buzzes and Judges' Vote			Result (August 19)
Quarter-Finalist	Order	Hasselhoff	Osbourne	Morgan	Result (August 19)
FootworKINGz	1				Won Judges' Vote
Marcus Terrell and the Serenades	2				Eliminated
Pixie Mystère	3				Lost Judges' Vote
Jay Mattioli	4				Eliminated
BRI	5				Eliminated
U4RIA Dance Crew	6				Eliminated
David Johnson	7				Eliminated
Hairo Torres	8				Advanced
G-Force	9				Eliminated
Jeffery Ou	10				Advanced
Mario & Jenny	11				Advanced
Lawrence Beamen	12				Advanced

==== Quarter-final 4 (August 25) ====
Guest Performer, Results Show: Reba McEntire

Quarter-Finalist	Order	Buzzes and Judges' Vote			Result (August 26)
Quarter-Finalist	Order	Hasselhoff	Osbourne	Morgan	Result (August 26)
Ishaara	1				Eliminated
Bárbara Padilla	2				Advanced
Pam Martin's Top Dogs	3				Eliminated
African High Flyers	4				Eliminated
Mia Boostrom	5				Lost Judges' Vote
Erik & Rickie	6				Won Judges' Vote
Coney Island Chris	7				Eliminated
Matt & Anthony	8				Eliminated
The Lollipop Girls	9				Eliminated
Drew Stevyns	10				Advanced
Recycled Percussion	11				Advanced
EriAm Sisters	12				Advanced

=== Semi-finals summary ===
Buzzed out | Advanced

==== Semi-final 1 (September 1) ====
Guest Performers, Result Show: Miss Piggy and Kermit the Frog, and David Hasselhoff

Semi-Finalist	Order	Buzzes			Result (September 2)
Semi-Finalist	Order	Hasselhoff	Osbourne	Morgan	Result (September 2)
Team Acrodunk	1				Eliminated
The Texas Tenors	2				Advanced
Paradizo Dance	3				Eliminated
Drew Thomas Magic & Illusions	4				Eliminated
Tony Hoard and Rory	5				Eliminated
The Voices of Glory ^{4}	6				Advanced
The Fab Five ^{4}	7				Advanced
Grandma Lee	8				Advanced
Arcadian Broad	9				Eliminated
Kevin Skinner	10				Advanced

- ^{4} Both acts were advanced into the next stage, after the judges could not decide on who to vote for advancing further in the competition. This decision meant no Judges' Vote was held in the next semi-final.

==== Semi-final 2 (September 8) ====
Guest Performer, Results Show: Cast of musical Jersey Boys.

Semi-Finalist	Order	Buzzes			Result (September 9)
Semi-Finalist	Order	Hasselhoff	Osbourne	Morgan	Result (September 9)
Recycled Percussion	1				Advanced
Lawrence Beamen	2				Advanced
Erik and Rickie	3				Eliminated
Jeffrey Ou	4				Eliminated
Hairo Torres	5				Advanced
EriAm Sisters	6				Eliminated
Mario and Jenny	7				Eliminated
Drew Stevyns	8				Advanced
FootworKINGz	9				Eliminated
Bárbara Padilla	10				Advanced

=== Final (September 14) ===
Guest Performers, Results Show: Thelma Houston, Shakira, Rascal Flatts, cast members of Cirque Du Soleil, Leona Lewis, and Susan Boyle.

Winner | Runner-up | 3rd place

Finalist	Order	Result (September 16)			
Finalist	Order	Result (September 16)	The Voices of Glory	1	Grand-finalist
Hairo Torres	2	Finalist			
Lawrence Beamen	3	Finalist			
Bárbara Padilla	4	2nd			
Fab Five	5	Finalist			
The Texas Tenors	6	Grand-finalist			
Drew Stevyns	7	Finalist			
Grandma Lee	8	Finalist			
Kevin Skinner	9	1st			
Recycled Percussion	10	3rd			

== Ratings ==
Order	Episode	Rating	Share	Rating/Share (18–49)	Viewers (millions)	Rank (night) (viewers)	Rank (week) (viewers)
1	"Auditions Episode 1"	6.8	12	3.3/10	11.30	#1	#1
2	"Auditions Episode 2"	6.2	11	3.1/9	10.39	#1	#3
3	"Auditions Episode 3"	7.5	13	3.7/11	12.91	#1	#1
4	"Auditions Episode 4"	6.8	12	2.9/9	11.30	#2	#3
5	"Auditions Episode 5"	6.2	10	3/9	10.43	#1	#2
6	"Auditions Episode 6"	6.9	12	3.3/10	11.69	#1	#1
7	"Auditions Episode 7"	8	13	3.6/10	13.17	#2	#2
8	"Auditions Episode 8"	6.9	12	2.9/9	11.38	#1	#4
9	"Auditions Episode 9"	8.2	14	3.4/10	13.75	#1	#1
10	"Auditions Episode 10; Susan Boyle Interview"	6.6	11	2.5/7	11.26	#1	#2
11	"Vegas Verdicts (Part 1)"	7.7	13	3.4/10	12.76	#1	#1
12	"Vegas Verdicts (Part 2)"	6.4	11	2.8/8	10.90	#1	#2
13	"Quarterfinals, Group 1"	7.7	14	3.6/11	12.97	#1	#1
14	"Quarterfinals, Group 1 Results"	6	10	2.9/9	10.68	#1	#2
15	"Quarterfinals, Group 2"	7.6	13	3.4/10	12.48	#1	#1
16	"Quarterfinals, Group 2 Results"	6.9	12	2.9/9	11.42	#1	#4
17	"Quarterfinals, Group 3"	7	12	2.9/9	11.59	#1	#2
18	"Quarterfinals, Group 3 Results"	6.4	11	2.4/7	10.29	#1	#4
19	"Quarterfinals, Group 4"	6.9	12	3/8	11.42	#1	#1
20	"Quarterfinals, Group 4 Results"	6.7	11	2.9/8	10.87	#1	#2
21	"Semifinals, Group 1"	7.5	13	3.2/9	12.81	#1	#1
22	"Semifinals, Group 1 Results"	7.4	12	2.6/8	12.39	#1	#2
23	"Semifinals, Group 2 "	7.1	12	2.9/8	12.03	#1	#5
24	"Semifinals, Group 2 Results"	6	9	2.1/5	10.06	#1	#10
25	"Finals, Performances"	8.5	13	3.3/9	13.84	#2	#3
26	"Finale"	9.5	16	3.5/10	15.53	#1	#2
