= Recycled Percussion =

American instrumental rock band

- Origin: Goffstown, New Hampshire
- Genres: Instrumental Rock
- Instruments: Drums, electric guitar
- Years active: 1995—present
- Website: Official website

Recycled Percussion is a Laconia, New Hampshire-based band. The group was originally formed in Goffstown, New Hampshire.

== History ==
Justin Spencer formed Recycled Percussion in 1995 for a high school talent show. Spencer, looking to be more creative than using traditional instruments, took the idea of playing buckets, which was introduced to him in the subways of New York City. Spencer then added more and more instruments to the show and expanded on the New York style of street percussion. Spencer specialized in using recycled materials to build instruments.

The band started to take off in 1999 when they were featured on the cover of USA Today. Recycled Percussion began touring the country in 2001. The group continued to tour for 10 years until they made their debut on season 4 of the television show America's Got Talent. The group auditioned with over hundred acts and became the then-highest-placed non-singing act to ever compete in the series' history, finishing third. They lost this distinction when Olate Dogs won season seven in 2012.

Afterwards, they began to work with Jerry Springer on a live version of "America's Got Talent". They spent three months performing at Planet Hollywood in Las Vegas and one month performing the live show at MGM Grand Foxwoods in Connecticut. In 2010, the band sealed a deal with the MGM Grand in Las Vegas to have their own show.

After runs of shows at the MGM, Tropicana and The Quad on the Las Vegas Strip, they last moved the show to the Saxe Theater at Planet Hollywood on the Las Vegas Strip. Their interactive show features the audience being given drumsticks and other unique instruments, incorporating non-traditional items like power tools, ladders, buckets and trashcans.

In 2017, the members of Recycled Percussion started Chaos & Kindness, a television and web series where they give back to communities around New Hampshire and beyond in unique and entertaining ways. In one episode, they pay for dental surgery for a friend of the band with cerebral palsy, and in another they perform for twenty-four hours straight. The band also owns and operates a clothing line of the same name with several locations around New Hampshire, as well as running an annual toy drive for local children.

== Discography ==
Studio albums

- Recycled Percussion in Manchester (1996)
- Covers, Pt. 1: Icon Covers (1997)
- Onhow (1998)
- IV: The 4th Album (2001)
- No Control in the Studio (2004)
- Las Vegas: In the Inside (2006)
- Recycled Percussion in Las Vegas (2006)
- Metallium Metal (2009)
- Lockout: Manchester (2011)
- Lockout: Las Vegas (2011)
- New Years Eve 1 (2014)
- Them Boys Are Back in Town: Manchester (2016)
- Them Boys Are Back in Town: Las Vegas (2016)
- New Years Eve 2 (2019)
- New Years Eve 3 (2020)
- Greedy Bendy (2020)

Extended plays

- The Beginning: RP (1995)
- Now

Live albums

- Live in Las Vegas! (2006)

Compilation albums

- Demos: Recycled Percussion (1995)
- The Best of Recycled Percussion (2008)
- The Collection: Recycled Percussion (2015)

Video albums

- Live in Las Vegas: DVD (2006)
