= America's Got Talent =

Televised talent show competition

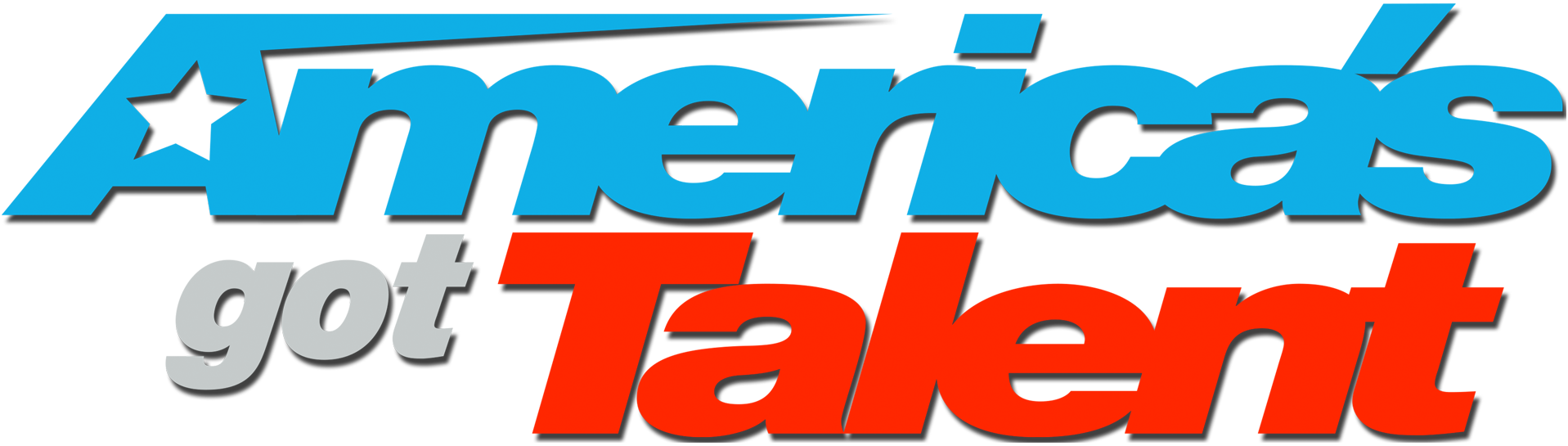
- Genre: Reality; Talent contest
- Created by: Simon Cowell
- Showrunners: Jason Raff; Sam Donnelly
- Directed by: Russell Norman
- Creative directors: Brian Friedman; Brian Burke
- Presented by: Regis Philbin; Jerry Springer; Nick Cannon; Tyra Banks; Terry Crews
- Judges: Piers Morgan; David Hasselhoff; Brandy Norwood; Sharon Osbourne; Howie Mandel; Howard Stern; Mel B; Heidi Klum; Simon Cowell; Julianne Hough; Gabrielle Union; Sofía Vergara
- Country of origin: United States
- Original language: English
- No. of seasons: 21
- No. of episodes: 508

Production
- Executive producers: Simon Cowell; Sam Donnelly; Jason Raff; Rob Wade; Trish Kinane; Richard Wallace
- Running time: 60–120 minutes
- Production companies: Fremantle; Syco Entertainment

Original release
- Network: NBC
- Release: June 21, 2006 – present

Related
- America's Got Talent: The Champions; America's Got Talent: Extreme; America's Got Talent: All-Stars; America's Got Talent: Fantasy League

America's Got Talent (often abbreviated as AGT) is an American talent show competition, and is part of the global Got Talent television franchise created by Simon Cowell. Produced by Fremantle USA and Syco Entertainment, it premiered on NBC on June 21, 2006, after plans for a British edition in 2005 were suspended, following a dispute within the British broadcaster ITV. Production would later resume in 2007, following the success of the first season. Each season is mainly run during the network's summer schedule and has featured various hosts over the course of the program's history. The current host is Terry Crews.

The program attracts a variety of participants from across the United States and abroad, who possess some form of talents. Acts range from singing, dancing, comedy, magic, stunts, variety and other genres. Each participant or act who auditions, attempts to secure a place in the live episodes of a season, by impressing a panel of judges. The current line-up consists of Cowell, Howie Mandel, Mel B, and Sofía Vergara. Participants making it into the live episodes, compete against each other for both the judges' and public's vote, in order to reach the live final. The winner receives a cash prize (primarily paid over a period of time), and since the third season, a chance to headline a show on the Las Vegas Strip.

The show itself has been a rating success for NBC, drawing in on average around 10 million viewers per season. In 2013, a book titled Inside AGT: The Untold Stories of America's Got Talent was released, providing a description of the seasons, contestants, judges and production techniques of the show. It includes detailed interviews with contestants from all seasons, up to the date of the book's publication.

The series has run for a total of twenty-one seasons, and has spawned four spin-off competitions: America's Got Talent: The Champions (2019–20), AGT: Extreme (2022), America's Got Talent: All-Stars (2023), and America's Got Talent: Fantasy League (2024).

== History ==
The concept of America's Got Talent was devised by The X Factor creator and Sony Music executive Simon Cowell, who sought to create a talent competition far grander than those of other televised talent contests. His proposal, first made to British television network ITV in 2005, was for a competition in which participants of any age and location could enter with any form of talent they chose to perform. The network favored the concept, and green-lit production of a pilot episode to test out the format, with Cowell forming a panel consisting of himself and two other judges (including tabloid journalist Piers Morgan). The pilot proved to be a success. The original plan for the program was for a British edition to be produced and broadcast between 2005 and 2006, hosted by British television personality Paul O'Grady, who had assisted with the pilot (before Cowell would propose the format for American television). However, O'Grady became involved in a dispute with ITV during work on the new program, ultimately terminating his contract with them and defecting to another British network.

As a result, Cowell suspended work on the British edition, and hastened his efforts on launching the format in America. Approaching several networks, Cowell received an offer from NBC to produce his televised competition for their network, owing to feedback given to the pilot made for ITV, and agreed to a contract to produce fifteen episodes for the 2006 summer schedule. Cowell worked with Fremantle and his company Syco Entertainment, but decided against becoming a judge for the new program, choosing to act as executive producer instead. Regis Philbin served as the host, with David Hasselhoff, Brandy Norwood and Morgan as judges. The first season proved a success, leading NBC to commission additional seasons, and prompting ITV to contact Cowell with the intention of resuming production on the British edition for 2007. The success of Britain's Got Talent (along with the American series), led Cowell to accept offers for the rights to the competition format, creating the Got Talent franchise.

== Format ==
Simon Cowell, creator of America's Got Talent and the Got Talent franchise, is primarily a judge on the British international version of the franchise. He has operated as a judge on AGT since May 2016.

=== Auditions ===
Each year's competition begins with a set of audition stages, the first being the "Producers' Auditions", is conducted across various cities in the United States. This stage is open to all forms of acts and judged by an independent group, and thus determines who will take part in the next stage of auditions titled "Judges' Auditions". These are held in a public venue, within select cities across the country, and are attended by the judges handling that year's contest.

Each participant reaching this stage of auditions is held offstage from the main performing area in a waiting room, and given a number that denotes when they will perform. Upon being called before the judges, the participant is given 90 seconds to demonstrate their act, with a live audience present for all performances. Each judge is given a buzzer, and may use it during a performance if they are unimpressed, dislike what is being performed, or feel the act is a waste of their time. If a participant is buzzed by all judges, their performance is automatically over. At the end of a performance, the judges give constructive criticism and feedback about what they saw, whereupon they are each given a vote. A participant requires a majority vote approving their performance to proceed to the next stage, otherwise they are eliminated from the program at that stage. Many acts that move on may be cut or forfeit their place, due to the limited slots available for the next stage. Filming for each season begins when the Judges' Auditions are taking place, with the show's presenter standing in the wings of each venue's stage to interview, and give personal commentary on a participant's performance.

From the fifth to seventh seasons, acts who did not attend live auditions could instead submit a taped audition online via YouTube. Acts from the online auditions were then selected to compete in front of the judges and a live audience during the "live shows" part of the season, prior to the semi-finals. Before the inclusion of this round, the show had a separate audition episode in Seasons 3 and 4 (2008–2009) for contestants who posted videos on MySpace.

In the ninth season, the show added a new format to the auditions in the form of the "Golden Buzzer", which began to make appearances within the Got Talent franchise, since it was first introduced on Germany's Got Talent. During auditions, each judge is allowed to use the Golden Buzzer to send an act automatically into the live shows, regardless of the opinion of the other judges. When it was initially used, the buzzer simply saved an act from elimination. The only rule to the buzzer was that a judge could use it only once per season. The host was later allowed to use the Golden Buzzer for an act starting from the eleventh season.

=== Second Round ===
After auditions are completed, the judges conduct a special session (or second "audition" round) to determine which participants will secure a place in the live rounds of the competition, though the format for this stage has been changed several times over the course of the program's history. When the stage was first created after the first season, it was designed around a "boot camp" format titled "Las Vegas Callbacks". Under the format's rules, participants who made it through the preliminary auditions could undergo training to perfect their act, whereupon each would be assigned to a specific group of participants and perform a second time before the judges. Buzzers would be used to terminate a performance at any time, with those not deemed worthy of a place being eliminated from that season's format.

Between the fourth and ninth season, the format was changed to match that used in Britain's Got Talent. Participants who made it through the preliminary auditions had their audition footage reviewed by the judges, who set each one into a specific group, and were not required to perform again (unless the judges requested this). Acts which they liked would be allocated spaces in the live rounds, with the remainder eliminated from that season's competition. All acts were brought back to learn of the results of the judges' deliberations. The format was titled "Vegas Verdicts" and held on the Las Vegas Strip. For the final seasons of its usage, it was re-dubbed "Judgment Week" and conducted within New York.

Between the tenth season and fourteenth season, the stage's format was changed again under a new arrangement dubbed "Judge Cuts". Under the new format's rules, participants that passed the preliminary auditions underwent a second stage of auditions before the judges at a fixed venue. However, their performance would not only be judged by the panel, but also by a special guest judge, with all participants divided up into four groups. Each group would be judged by their own guest judge. Like the auditions, the main judges could use their buzzers at any time to stop a performance, while the guest judge would be allowed to use a Golden Buzzer for a participant they particularly liked (as well as providing comments on the performances they watched). In the fifteenth season, the round was condensed into a single episode and featured no guest judge, due to the COVID-19 pandemic in the United States in 2020. The round was replaced to its current arrangement for the sixteenth season, matching that of Britain's Got Talent around that time.

=== Live Rounds ===
Participants who pass their auditions and secure a place in the live rounds of the competitions, including those who received the Golden Buzzer after the format's introduction and subsequent amendment to match other Got Talent editions, are divided into groups and compete against each other to secure a place within the live final of the competition. Live episodes of the competition are held within a set venue (the location has varied), with the current arrangement focused on a venue within Los Angeles and live episodes for each season being aired weekly on the network. The arrangement differs from the schedule used by other international editions. Britain's Got Talent, for example, broadcasts its live episodes within the space of a single week. The structure of the live rounds by this stage of the competition has varied, but is more commonly arranged as quarter-finals, semi-finals and the final itself. Earlier seasons varied, sometimes having the finals split into separate rounds.

The format of the live rounds, for the quarter-finals and semi-finals, sees each participant conduct a new performance of their act before the judges and the viewers within a "performance" episode. In this episode, the judges can still give out feedback and comments about a participant's performance, and be able to use their buzzers, with the performance terminated if all the buzzers are used. After the episode is broadcast, the network provides the public a set period of time to vote for their act, with the results of these held in a separate "results" episode. When it is broadcast has varied, though it more commonly occurs after an interval of one day after the live "performance" episode. Participants wore the same outfits from the performance episode and are then informed of the results, with those receiving the highest votes (i.e. Top 4) advancing to the next stage. For the two acts that receive the mid-range of votes for all participants, they undergo a vote by the judges to determine who joins those who advanced. When the program brought in the format of using four judges, a tie-break on this vote results in the act with the higher number of public votes moving on. The Judges' vote was not a common format element in earlier seasons. In the first season, the judges did not decide on who moved on, instead voting for acts they liked or disliked. In the second season, they could not vote on acts at all, instead only being able to buzz them.

For some acts that are eliminated, there is still a chance for advancement by being appointed as that round's "Wildcard". Until the tenth season, this format varied in how it would work. In some seasons, the judges could each individually select an act, or more than one, to move on to the next stage or compete within a special Wildcard round. In other seasons, the Wildcard acts were selected from among the auditions and competed in a special round. Since the tenth season, the format is more structured and works in a similar manner to that of the format used by Britain's Got Talent, in that the judges and the public can each chose the acts they want to see move on as a Wildcard act. Although the judges are refrained from choosing a quarter-finalist as a Wildcard act, the public may vote online for an act within each quarter-final and semi-final to move on into the next stage, with this vote aptly named after the sponsor for the show in that respective season.

Those who make it into the season's final compete against each other to secure the most votes from the public, with the number of finalists varying between seasons. Later seasons allow each finalist more than one performance and sometimes being joined by a celebrity guest, previous winner, or notable participant from a previous season. The winning act that achieves the most votes is crowned the winner and receives a cash prize. Although stipulated as $1 million per the program's advertising, in reality winners can choose to either take it as a lump sum, or as a financial annuity of this amount that is paid out over forty years at $25,000 per year. Both options are liable to taxation. Since Season 10, the winner will also perform on the first results show of the next season. From 2008, the program also includes an additional prize of headlining a show, except from between 2010 and 2013, where the winning finalist headlined a national tour. The show they headline mainly takes place within Las Vegas.

== Judges and hosts ==
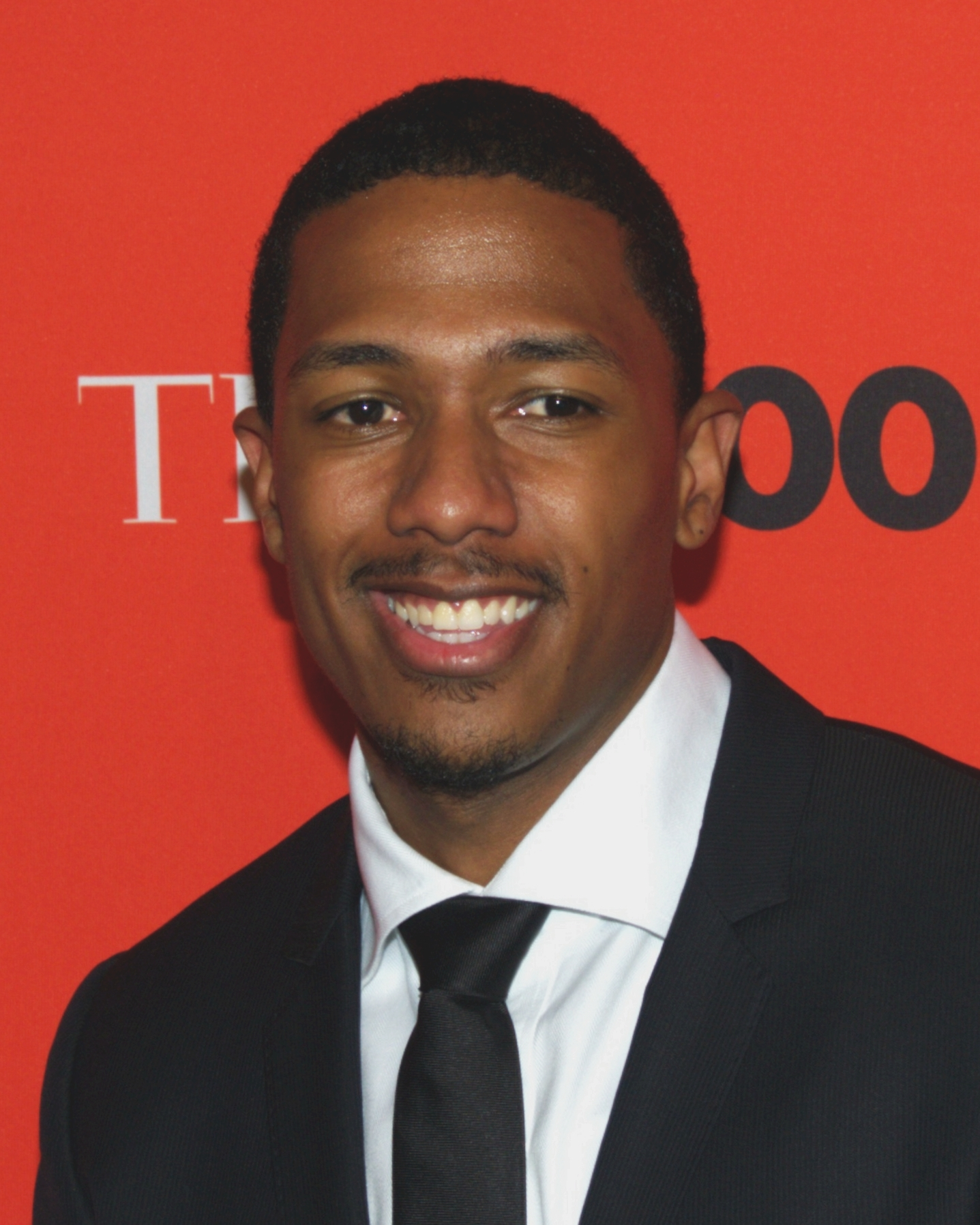
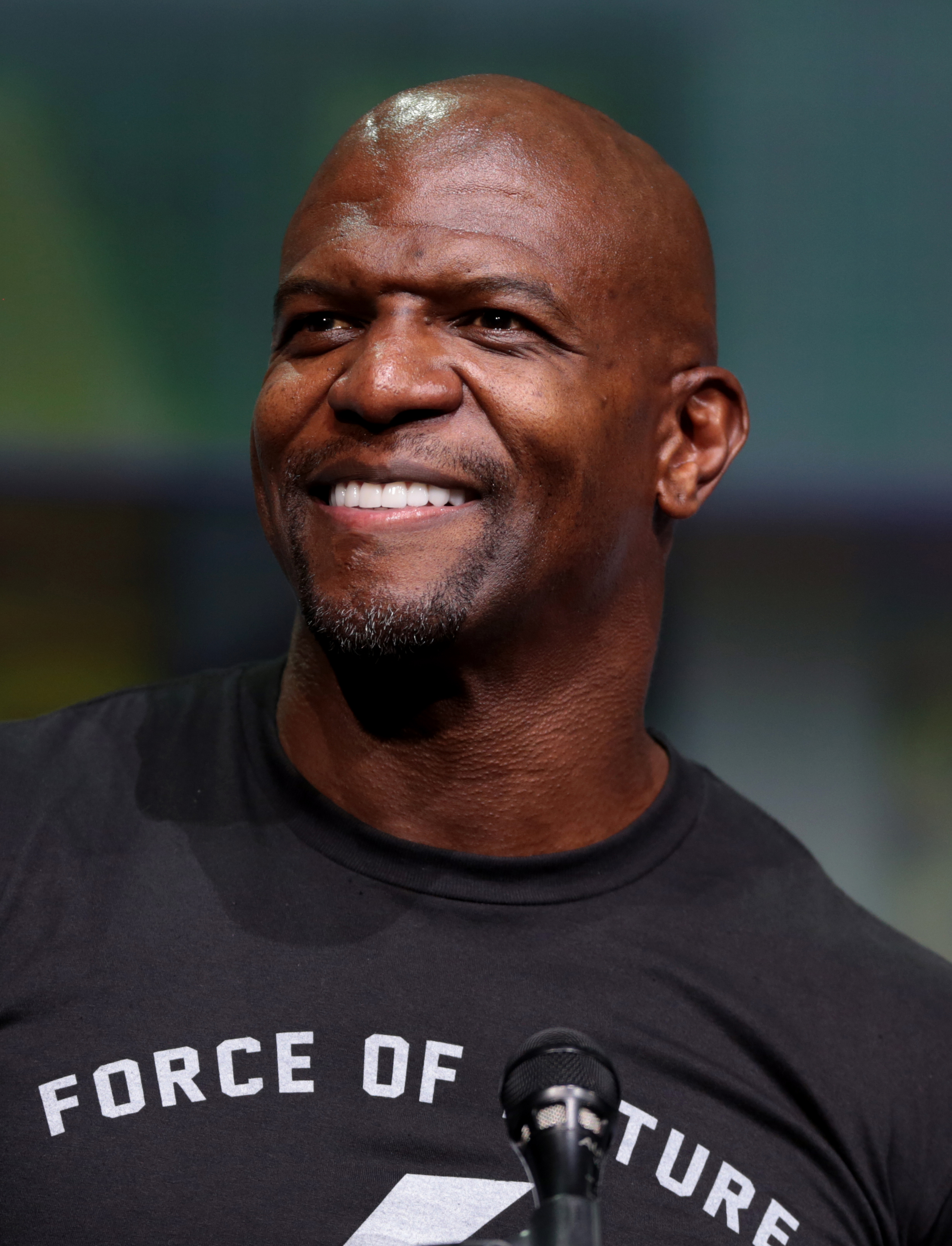
Nick Cannon and Terry Crews are currently the longest-serving hosts of the series, hosting eight seasons each (excluding spinoffs); Cannon hosted from 2009-2016, and Crews has served as host since 2019.

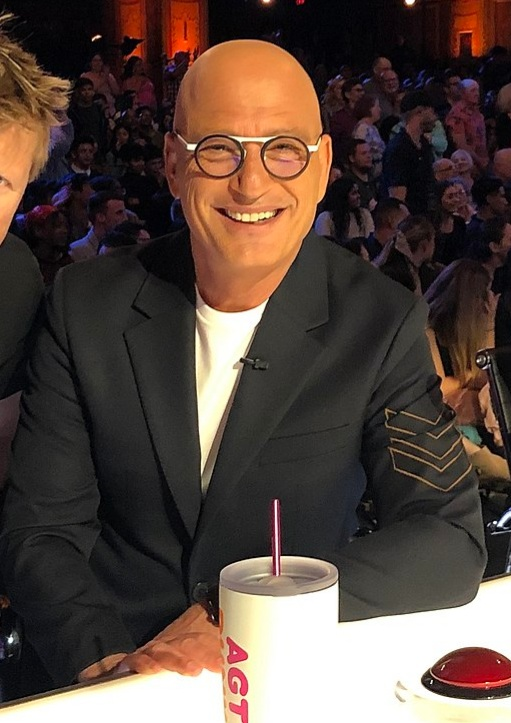
Howie Mandel is the longest serving judge on America's Got Talent, since joining in June 2010.

| Season | Host | Judges (in order of first appearance) | | | |
|---|---|---|---|---|---|
| 1 | Regis Philbin | Piers Morgan | David Hasselhoff | Brandy Norwood | —N/a |
| 2 | Jerry Springer | Piers Morgan | David Hasselhoff | Sharon Osbourne | —N/a |
| 3 | Jerry Springer | Piers Morgan | David Hasselhoff | Sharon Osbourne | —N/a |
| 4 | Nick Cannon | Piers Morgan | David Hasselhoff | Sharon Osbourne | —N/a |
| 5 | Nick Cannon | Piers Morgan | Howie Mandel | Sharon Osbourne | —N/a |
| 6 | Nick Cannon | Piers Morgan | Howie Mandel | Sharon Osbourne | —N/a |
| 7 | Nick Cannon | Howard Stern | Howie Mandel | Sharon Osbourne | —N/a |
| 8 | Nick Cannon | Howard Stern | Howie Mandel | Mel B | Heidi Klum |
| 9 | Nick Cannon | Howard Stern | Howie Mandel | Mel B | Heidi Klum |
| 10 | Nick Cannon | Howard Stern | Howie Mandel | Mel B | Heidi Klum |
| 11 | Nick Cannon | Simon Cowell^{1} | Howie Mandel | Mel B | Heidi Klum |
| 12 | Tyra Banks | Simon Cowell^{1} | Howie Mandel | Mel B | Heidi Klum |
| 13 | Tyra Banks | Simon Cowell^{1} | Howie Mandel | Mel B | Heidi Klum |
| 14 | Terry Crews | Simon Cowell^{1} | Howie Mandel | Gabrielle Union | Julianne Hough |
| 15 | Terry Crews | Simon Cowell^{1} | Howie Mandel | Sofía Vergara | Heidi Klum^{2} |
| 16 | Terry Crews | Simon Cowell^{1} | Howie Mandel | Sofía Vergara | Heidi Klum^{2} |
| 17 | Terry Crews | Simon Cowell^{1} | Howie Mandel | Sofía Vergara | Heidi Klum^{2} |
| 18 | Terry Crews | Simon Cowell^{1} | Howie Mandel | Sofía Vergara | Heidi Klum^{2} |
| 19 | Terry Crews | Simon Cowell^{1} | Howie Mandel | Sofía Vergara | Heidi Klum^{2} |
| 20 | Terry Crews | Simon Cowell^{1} | Howie Mandel | Sofía Vergara | Mel B |
| 21 | Terry Crews | Simon Cowell^{1} | Howie Mandel | Sofía Vergara | Mel B |

Notes

1. Cowell was absent from the live shows of season 15 due to an accident that resulted in a back injury. After doctors required him to remain under medical observation, production brought in temporary stand-ins for the first two quarter finals of season 15 before settling on airing the remaining live rounds with a judging panel of three. Cowell later underwent a follow-up medical procedure during season 21, causing him to miss several additional weeks of live shows.
2. Eric Stonestreet had to stand in for Klum during part of season 15 after she fell ill during the last two audition sessions.

In its first season, the judging panel consisted of David Hasselhoff, Brandy Norwood and Piers Morgan, with Regis Philbin as the host. Prior to the start of the second season, Norwood stepped down due to a legal matter she was involved with, leading to her being replaced by Sharon Osbourne. Philbin was replaced by Jerry Springer as the show's host. Further changes were made to the judging panel and hosting duties in later seasons: Springer left after the third season, and was replaced by Nick Cannon for the fourth season. Hasselhoff left the show after the fourth season, and was replaced by Howie Mandel for the fifth season. Morgan left after the sixth season, and was replaced by Howard Stern for the seventh season.

In August 2012, Osbourne left the program following a dispute with NBC. While the network replaced her with former Spice Girls member Mel B in February 2013, the judges panel increased to four. This format change had already occurred in other international versions of the competition, such as on Britain's Got Talent two years prior. In March 2013, supermodel Heidi Klum was announced as the fourth judge for the eighth season. In October 2015, Stern was replaced by Simon Cowell for the eleventh season. After his eighth year hosting America's Got Talent, Cannon announced plans to retire from the show due to comments he made about the network. Despite being under contract to continue his hosting duties, NBC eventually replaced him with Tyra Banks for the twelfth season.

On February 11, 2019, NBC announced a change to the program's host and its judging panel following the conclusion of the thirteenth season. Banks decided to move on to other projects, leading to her being replaced by Terry Crews, who was already working with the network as host of America's Got Talent: The Champions. Both Klum and Mel B decided to leave America's Got Talent due to other commitments that year, leading to actress Gabrielle Union and dancer Julianne Hough replacing them, joining Mandel and Cowell on the judging panel. However, both Union and Hough took part in only one season before they were let go by the program on November 22, 2019. On February 27, 2020, it was confirmed that Klum would return for the next season, and announced Sofía Vergara as the fourth judge. In September 2021, host Crews announced the 'end of an era' following the season sixteen finale of America's Got Talent and the series finale of Brooklyn Nine-Nine, stating that these both marked the end of his deal with NBC. However, Crews continued his hosting duties in the following seasons. On February 3, 2025, it was announced that Mel B would return to the judging panel after a six season hiatus for the twentieth season, replacing Klum.

=== Guest judges ===
In 2015, guest judges were introduced into the program as part of the revamp of the format's boot camp stage. The following lists the guest judges who appeared within the program for the "Judge Cuts", per season and in order of their appearance by week:

| Season | Guest judges in Judge Cuts (in order of appearance) | | | |
| Season | 1 | 2 | 3 | 4 |
|---|---|---|---|---|
| 10 | Neil Patrick Harris | Michael Bublé | Marlon Wayans | Piers Morgan |
| 11 | Ne-Yo | Reba McEntire | George Lopez | Louis Tomlinson |
| 12 | Chris Hardwick | DJ Khaled | Laverne Cox | Seal |
| 13 | Ken Jeong | Olivia Munn | Martina McBride | Chris Hardwick |
| 14 | Brad Paisley | Dwyane Wade | Ellie Kemper | Jay Leno |

== Series overview ==
| Season | Episodes | Originally released | | Winners | Runners-up | Third place |
| Season | Episodes | First released | Last released | Winners | Runners-up | Third place |
|---|---|---|---|---|---|---|
| 1 | 11 | June 21, 2006 | August 17, 2006 | Bianca Ryan | All That / The Millers (Note: Although both acts were runners-up, neither were defined in terms of 2nd and 3rd place during the broadcast of the final's result for this season.) | —N/a |
| 2 | 16 | June 5, 2007 | August 21, 2007 | Terry Fator | Cas Haley | Butterscotch |
| 3 | 20 | June 17, 2008 | October 1, 2008 | Neal E. Boyd | Eli Mattson | Nuttin' But Stringz |
| 4 | 26 | June 23, 2009 | September 16, 2009 | Kevin Skinner | Bárbara Padilla | Recycled Percussion |
| 5 | 32 | June 1, 2010 | September 15, 2010 | Michael Grimm | Jackie Evancho | Fighting Gravity |
| 6 | 32 | May 31, 2011 | September 14, 2011 | Landau Eugene Murphy Jr. | Silhouettes | Team iLuminate |
| 7 | 31 | May 14, 2012 | September 13, 2012 | Olate Dogs | Tom Cotter | William Close |
| 8 | 35 | June 4, 2013 | September 18, 2013 | Kenichi Ebina | Taylor Williamson | Jimmy Rose |
| 9 | 32 | May 27, 2014 | September 17, 2014 | Mat Franco | Emily West | AcroArmy |
| 10 | 27 | May 26, 2015 | September 16, 2015 | Paul Zerdin | Drew Lynch | Oz Pearlman |
| 11 | 26 | May 31, 2016 | September 14, 2016 | Grace VanderWaal | The Clairvoyants | Jon Dorenbos |
| 12 | 24 | May 30, 2017 | September 20, 2017 | Darci Lynne | Angelica Hale | Light Balance |
| 13 | 24 | May 29, 2018 | September 19, 2018 | Shin Lim | Zurcaroh | Brian King Joseph |
| 14 | 23 | May 28, 2019 | September 18, 2019 | Kodi Lee | Detroit Youth Choir | Ryan Niemiller |
| 15 | 25 | May 26, 2020 | September 23, 2020 | Brandon Leake | Broken Roots | Cristina Rae |
| 16 | 21 | June 1, 2021 | September 15, 2021 | Dustin Tavella | Aidan Bryant | Josh Blue |
| 17 | 22 | May 31, 2022 | September 14, 2022 | Mayyas | Kristy Sellars | Drake Milligan |
| 18 | 24 | May 30, 2023 | September 27, 2023 | Adrian Stoica and Hurricane | Anna DeGuzman | Murmuration |
| 19 | 21 | May 28, 2024 | September 24, 2024 | Richard Goodall | Roni Sagi & Rhythm | Sky Elements |
| 20 | 24 | May 27, 2025 | September 24, 2025 | Jessica Sanchez | Chris Turner | Jourdan Blue |
| 21 | 23 | June 2, 2026 | September 23, 2026 | Nene Royal | Geno Ploeger | Hundred Fingers |

=== Season 1 (2006) ===
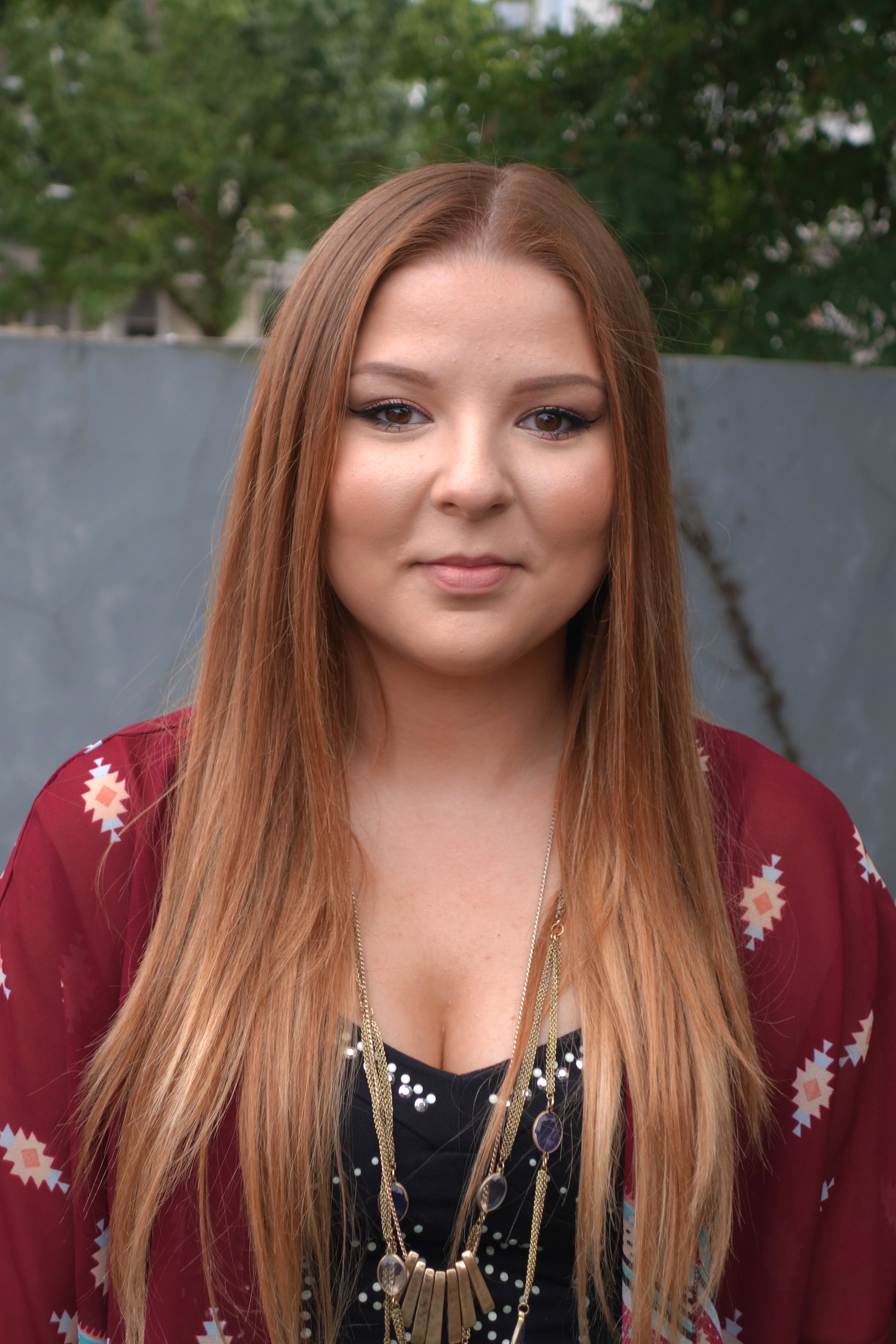
Bianca Ryan, season one winner

The first season for America's Got Talent was promoted in May 2006, and was eventually aired later that year between June 21 and August 17. While later episodes would pre-record auditions at earlier dates, this season had them conducted across June, at venues within the cities of New York City, Chicago, and Los Angeles. Live-round episodes were held within the latter city. Initial advertisements for participants of America's Got Talent implied that the winning act would headline a show in Las Vegas, but this was later dropped in favor of a cash prize of $1 million, due to concerns surrounding the possibility of awarding such a prize to a minor.

The first season was hosted by Regis Philbin, with the judging panel consisting of actor David Hasselhoff, singer Brandy Norwood and journalist Piers Morgan. More than 12 million viewers watched the program's premiere episode, a far greater viewing figure than had been achieved by the premiere of American Idol in 2002, becoming one of the most-watched program on U.S. television and the highest-rated among viewers aged 18 to 49 at that time. The first season was won by singer Bianca Ryan, with clogging group All That and musical group The Millers being the runners-up. Neither act were defined in the results in terms of who was placed 2nd, and who was placed in 3rd.

=== Season 2 (2007) ===
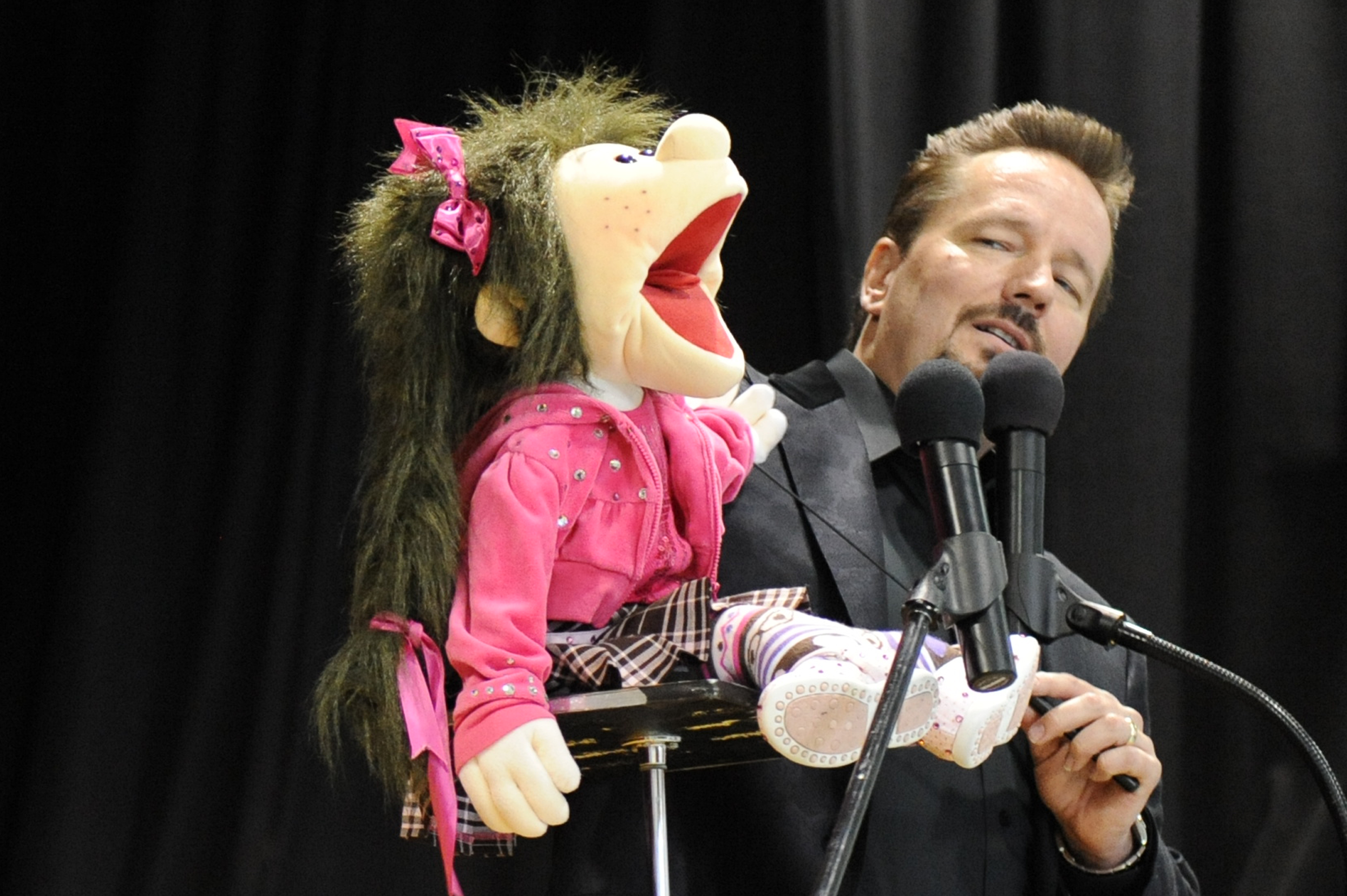
Terry Fator, season two winner

Following the success of the previous season, NBC commissioned the program for additional episodes, but originally intended for the new season to be aired as part of its 2007 winter schedule. However, the network decided against this due to the program potentially being placed in direct competition for viewers with American Idol, and kept America's Got Talent within its 2007 summer schedule. The second season aired between June 5 and August 21, 2007. Prior to filming taking place, Philbin left the program and was replaced as host by Jerry Springer. Norwood dropped out, due to a legal situation, and was replaced by Sharon Osbourne. Auditions for this season involved venues within the same cities as had been previously used, but with the inclusion of Dallas as part of its competition schedule.

The second season saw the introduction of a new round in the audition process, which was referred to as the "boot camp stage", a period of callback episodes filmed in Las Vegas, aimed at streamlining successful participants from the first round of auditions towards a set number for the live rounds. Alongside this, participants in the live rounds moved on via the public vote only, while the episode for results was aired a week after each live episode's performance and within a smaller time slot for its broadcast. This season was won by singing impressionist and ventriloquist Terry Fator, with singer and guitarist Cas Haley coming in second, and singer Butterscotch placing third.

=== Season 3 (2008) ===
Neal E. Boyd, season three winner

The third season aired between June 17 and October 1, 2008, with a break in its broadcast between August 7 and 26 to avoid conflict with NBC's live broadcasts of the 2008 Summer Olympics. Auditions took place much earlier in the production schedule to provide time for finalizing editing on recorded footage, taking place between January and April across venues within the same cities from the previous season, but with the addition of a venue within the city of Atlanta. Unlike the previous season, the Las Vegas callback episodes doubled the number of semi-finalists involved in the live rounds.

Following the second season, judges voted between the participants placed 5th and 6th in the public vote during the quarterfinals and semi-finals, to determine who moved on at each stage. Apart from some amendments to the program's format, staff also implemented cosmetic changes to the set pieces used on America's Got Talent. An example of this included the "red X's", used to symbolize disapproval from each judge, being redesigned to match the visual style of those used in Britain's Got Talent. This season was won by opera singer Neal E. Boyd, with singer and pianist Eli Mattson coming in second, and violinists Nuttin' But Stringz placing third.

=== Season 4 (2009) ===
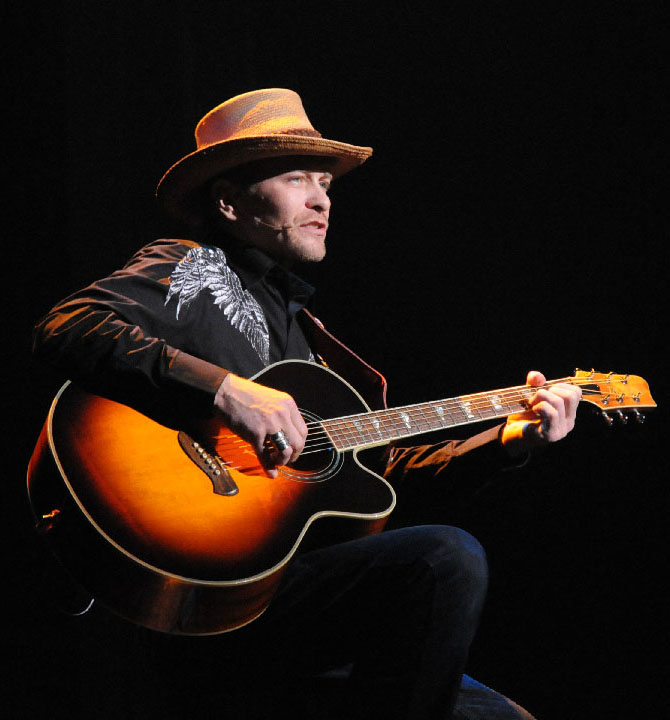
Kevin Skinner, season four winner

The fourth season aired between June 23 and September 19, 2009, and was the first season to be broadcast in high definition. Auditions were held between January and April, at venues within New York, Los Angeles, Chicago and Atlanta. Additional auditions were held within Washington, D.C., Miami, Tacoma, Boston and Houston. Along with conducting live auditions, participants could also audition by uploading a video of their performance directly to the program's website. Prior to filming taking place, Springer departed from the program following the previous season, and was replaced by Nick Cannon as host.

For the fourth year of the competition, the prize for winning was amended so that the winner not only received a cash prize, but would be given their own 0-week headline show at the Planet Hollywood Resort and Casino on the Las Vegas Strip. Apart from the change in the prize, the Results episodes after each performance episode were returned to their original broadcast format. This season was won by country music singer Kevin Skinner, with opera singer Bárbara Padilla coming in second, and percussionists Recycled Percussion placing third.

=== Season 5 (2010) ===
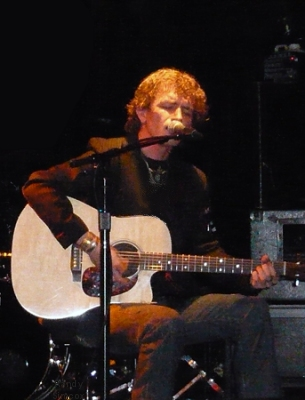
Michael Grimm, season five winner

The fifth season was originally intended to be aired as part of NBC's 2009 Fall schedule, much as had been intended with the second season. However, the network disliked the idea and made certain the program was part of its 2010 summer schedule, with this season airing between June 1 and September 15, 2010. Audition were held between January and April, at venues in Atlanta, Chicago, Dallas, Los Angeles, New York City, Orlando, Portland (Oregon), and Philadelphia. Prior to filming taking place, Hasselhoff left the show due to other commitments, and his role as judge was taken over by comedian Howie Mandel.

Online auditions for the program were modified to allow registration via YouTube, with a guaranteed placement in the competition. The live rounds were extended to include two new quarter-finals, each themed to certain groups of participants: those who were chosen from their YouTube auditions and those who had been eliminated during the second round of auditions or their quarter-finals. The final stage of the competition included its finalists conducting performances, each with their own guest performer, a format that would become a part of the program and an optional choice for finalists in future seasons. The finalists were offered a place on the America's Got Talent Live Tour that year, regardless of their final result, although the winner would be made the headline act for the tour in addition to their main prize. This season was won by singer/musician Michael Grimm, with classical singer Jackie Evancho coming in second, and performance group Fighting Gravity placing third.

=== Season 6 (2011) ===
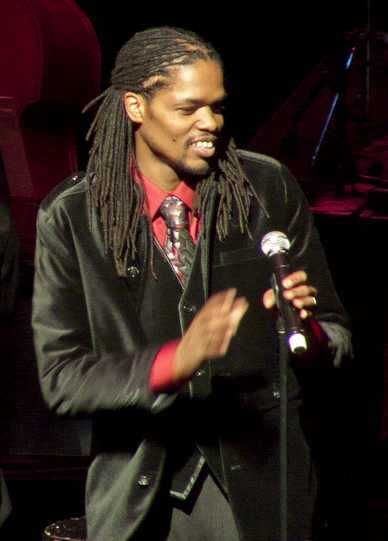
Landau Eugene Murphy Jr., season six winner

The sixth season aired between May 31 and September 14, 2011, with no major changes to the format for this year. Auditions were held between January and April within Los Angeles, New York, Atlanta, Houston, Minneapolis, Seattle, Denver and Chicago. Online auditions made via YouTube were conducted on May 4. This season was won by singer Landau Eugene Murphy Jr., with dance group Silhouettes coming in second, and dance group Team iLuminate placing third.

=== Season 7 (2012) ===
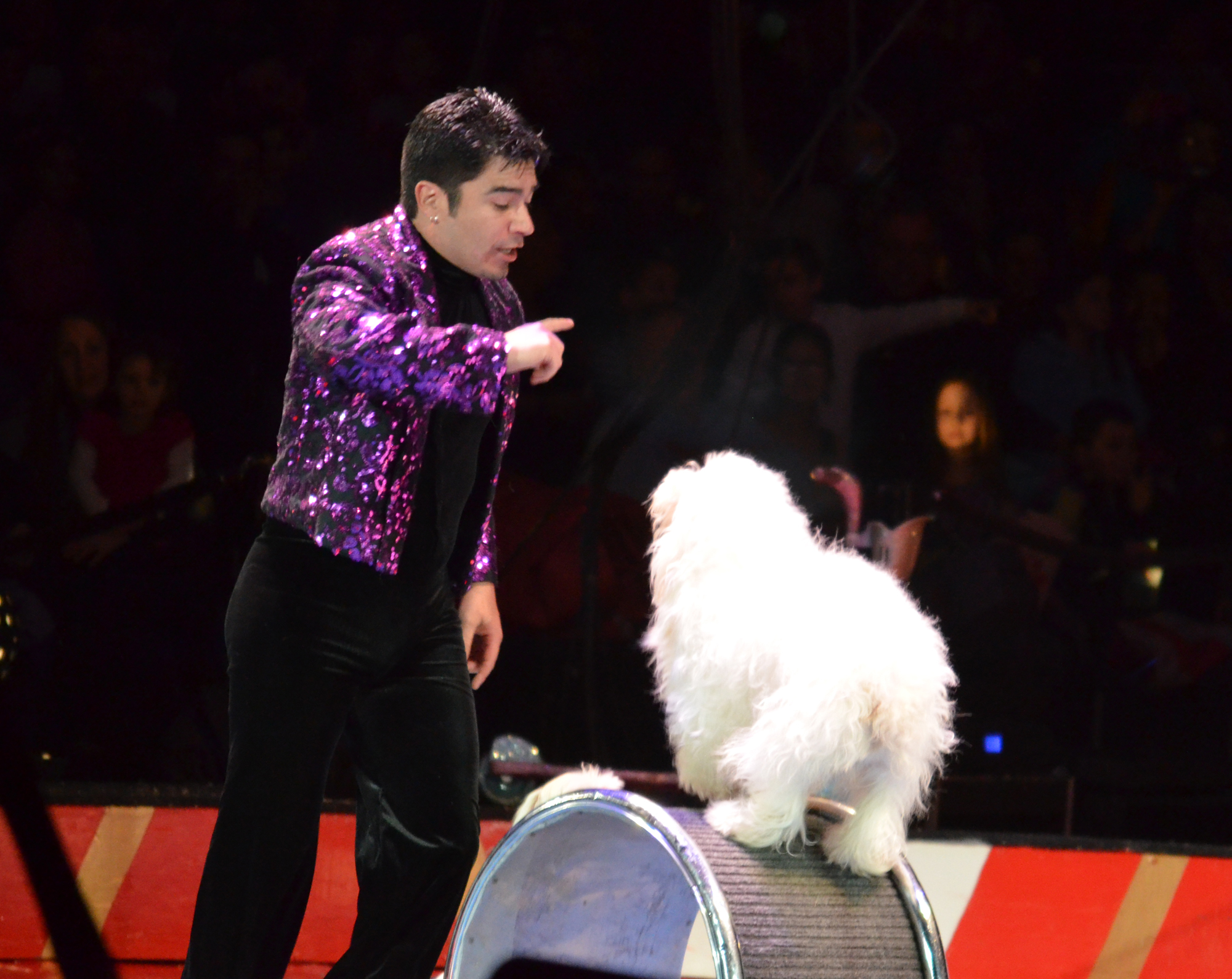
Olate Dogs, season seven winners

The seventh season aired between May 14 and September 13, 2012, with auditions held between October 2011 and February 2012. These were conducted within the cities of New York, Washington, D.C., Tampa, Charlotte, Austin, Anaheim, St. Louis and San Francisco. Prior to filming taking place, Morgan departed from America's Got Talent after the conclusion of the sixth season (despite signing a three-year contract with the program in July 2010), due to other commitments he had at that time.

Due to Morgan's departure, his role as judge was taken over by radio personality Howard Stern. However, because of his involvement with hosting his radio show for SiriusXM, the program's production of live episodes were moved to a venue in New York to avoid disrupting his schedule. The graphical presentation of America's Got Talent was revamped, including the title credits, logo and theme music. The change of venue to the New Jersey Performing Arts Center in Newark, New Jersey not only allowed Cowell to have designers update the studio set, but allowed production staff to invite larger audiences for performances in live episodes than in previous seasons. This season was won by dog tricks act Olate Dogs, with comedian Tom Cotter coming in second, and musician William Close placing third.

=== Season 8 (2013) ===
The eighth season aired between June 4 and September 18, 2013, with auditions held between January and March in a much larger range of venues. Auditions held in the cities of New York, New Orleans, Los Angeles, Chicago and San Antonio were filmed for the new season. Prior to filming commencing, Osbourne left AGT following the seventh season, after a lengthy dispute in August 2012 between herself and NBC. While her departure not only led to her role as judge being taken over by Spice Girls member Mel B, the judge panel for future seasons was increased, recruiting supermodel Heidi Klum to join the new season as a fourth judge.

For the live episodes of this season, the venue moved from Newark to New York, holding them within Radio City Music Hall. In addition, the format for audition episodes in terms of presentation style, was changed to match that for Britain's Got Talent. In this arrangement, each episode would consist of a number of auditions chosen from those taken from each major venue used for that season. This season was won by martial arts dancer/mime Kenichi Ebina, becoming the first foreign act to win America's Got Talent, with stand-up comedian Taylor Williamson coming in second, and singer/guitarist Jimmy Rose placed third.

=== Season 9 (2014) ===
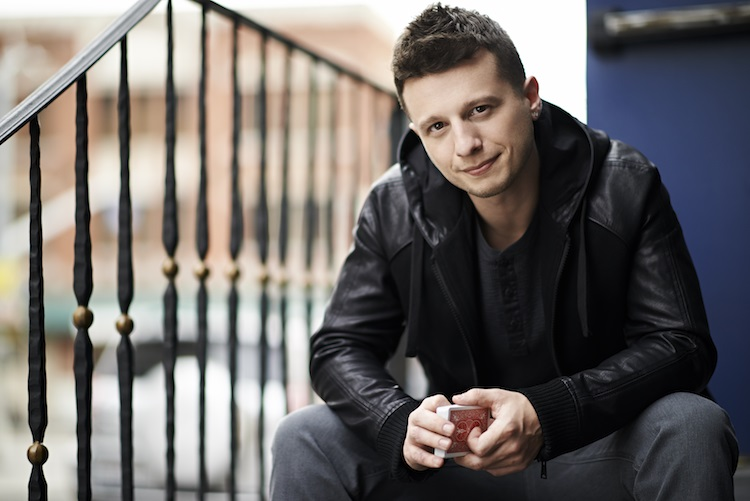
Mat Franco, season nine winner

The ninth season aired between May 27 and September 17, 2014. Preliminary auditions were held between October and December 2013, across several cities including Miami, Atlanta, Houston and Baltimore. The Judge auditions were held between February and April 2014 within Newark, New York and Los Angeles. For this season only, a third-party program was involved in the audition process: one quarter-final place in the competition was offered exclusively by The Today Show via their website, with the top three picked from those that entered competing against each other to be part of America's Got Talent that year.

Several changes were made to the program for this season. The most significant was the introduction of the "Golden Buzzer" format, first introduced on Germany's Got Talent in 2012, which had also been introduced into Britain's Got Talent earlier that year. However, it was used mainly to save an act from elimination in the auditions, and wouldn't match the format used across the Got Talent franchise until the following year.

Other changes included the "boot camp" round being filmed in New York, and the introduction of a new online vote for viewers, named after the program's sponsor during that season. This determined which three acts placed in the mid-range of the public vote: 5th, 6th and 7th in the semi-finals, with 4th, 5th and 6th in the "Top 12" round advancing, and the remaining two voted by the judges. This season was won by magician Mat Franco, with singer Emily West coming second, and acrobatic troupe AcroArmy placing third.

=== Season 10 (2015) ===
The tenth season aired during 2015, between May 26 and September 16. Producer auditions took place between late 2014 and early 2015 within Tampa, Nashville, Richmond, New York, Chicago, St. Louis, San Antonio, Albuquerque, San Francisco, Seattle, Boise, Las Vegas and Los Angeles. Judge auditions took place during spring until early summer 2015, between March and June within Newark, New York and Los Angeles. A special "extreme" audition session was held within Pomona, California (performed on an outdoor stage), for participants with acts considered too dangerous to be conducted within an indoor studio set.

This season had the Golden Buzzer format, introduced in the previous season, matching that of Britain's Got Talent. Its use would send a participant directly into the live rounds, although the host was not allowed to use it per the revised format. In addition, the boot camp round was revamped with a new format and renamed as "Judge Cuts", in which they were held over four weeks rather than one. It consisted of about eighty acts shortlisted from the auditions with around twenty per week, and featured the involvement of a guest judge for each of these episodes. Along with the main judges, they could use the Golden Buzzer for an act they wished to see in the live rounds. Neil Patrick Harris, Michael Bublé, Marlon Wayans and Piers Morgan became the first guest judges for the new format in this season. The "Snapple Vote", introduced in the previous season, was renamed the "Dunkin' Save" to coincide with the program's new sponsor. Its format expanded to cover quarter-finalists who finished in 6th, 7th or 8th place per public vote, along with the semi-finalists who finished in 4th, 5th or 6th place per public votes.

This season was won by ventriloquist Paul Zerdin, with comedian Drew Lynch coming in second, and magician mentalist Oz Pearlman placing third.

=== Season 11 (2016) ===
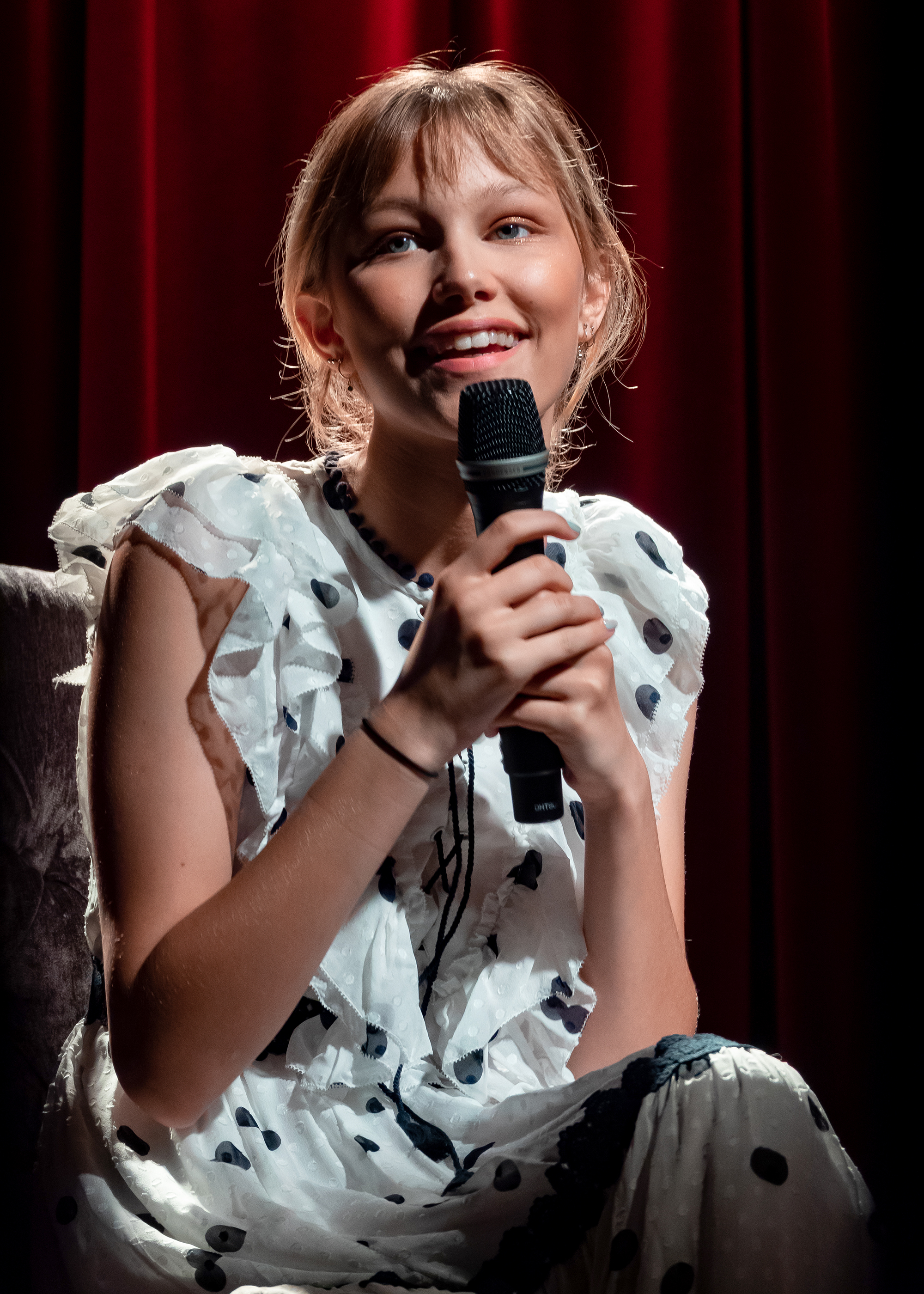
Grace VanderWaal, season eleven winner

The eleventh season aired during 2016, between May 31 and September 16. Open auditions were held between late 2015 and early 2016, within Detroit, New York, Phoenix, Salt Lake City, Las Vegas, San Jose, San Diego, Kansas City, Los Angeles, Atlanta, Orlando and Dallas. Filming of the judges' auditions took place in March 2016, prior to the premiere episode of the season, and were exclusively conducted within the Pasadena Civic Auditorium in Los Angeles. The season premiered on May 31, 2016. During the previous season on June 24, 2015, Howard Stern announced his departure from America's Got Talent on his TV program, leading to Simon Cowell announcing on October 22 that he would later be replacing him for season eleven. On October 4, 2016, Cowell signed a contract that would keep him as a judge on America's Got Talent until 2019. Stern's departure led to live-round broadcasts moving back to Los Angeles, and filmed at the Dolby Theatre. Apart from this change, the Golden Buzzer format allowed the host (Nick Cannon) to use it during auditions.

The guest judges who featured in the Judge Cuts for the eleventh season consisted of Ne-Yo, Reba McEntire, George Lopez and Louis Tomlinson. This season was won by singer-songwriter and musician Grace VanderWaal, with magician mentalist duo The Clairvoyants coming in second, and magician Jon Dorenbos placing third.

=== Season 12 (2017) ===
The twelfth season aired during 2017, between May 30 and September 20. Open auditions were held in late 2016 to early 2017, within Chicago, Austin, Cleveland, Jacksonville, Philadelphia, Las Vegas, San Diego, New York, Charleston, Memphis and Los Angeles. Filming of the Judges' audition were conducted in March 2017 at the Pasadena Civic Auditorium in Los Angeles. On February 13, 2017, Nick Cannon resigned from hosting America's Got Talent, following a dispute between himself and NBC concerning remarks he had made during his Showtime comedy special Stand Up, Don't Shoot. As a result, despite Cannon being under contract, the network replaced him with supermodel Tyra Banks.

This season is notable for the death of American physician Brandon Rogers (who died in an automobile accident on June 11, 2017), shortly after securing his place on America's Got Talent during the audition's stage. Rogers became involved in the program, following his involvement with American R&B vocal group Boyz II Men earlier that year, after the group had seen footage of him singing on YouTube. In the wake of his death, his audition was postponed before eventually airing during the final audition episode of the season on July 11, as a tribute to his memory.

The guest judges who featured in the Judge Cuts for the twelfth season consisted of Chris Hardwick, DJ Khaled, Laverne Cox and Seal. This season was won by singer ventriloquist Darci Lynne, with singer Angelica Hale coming in second, and Ukrainian dance act Light Balance placing third.

=== Season 13 (2018) ===
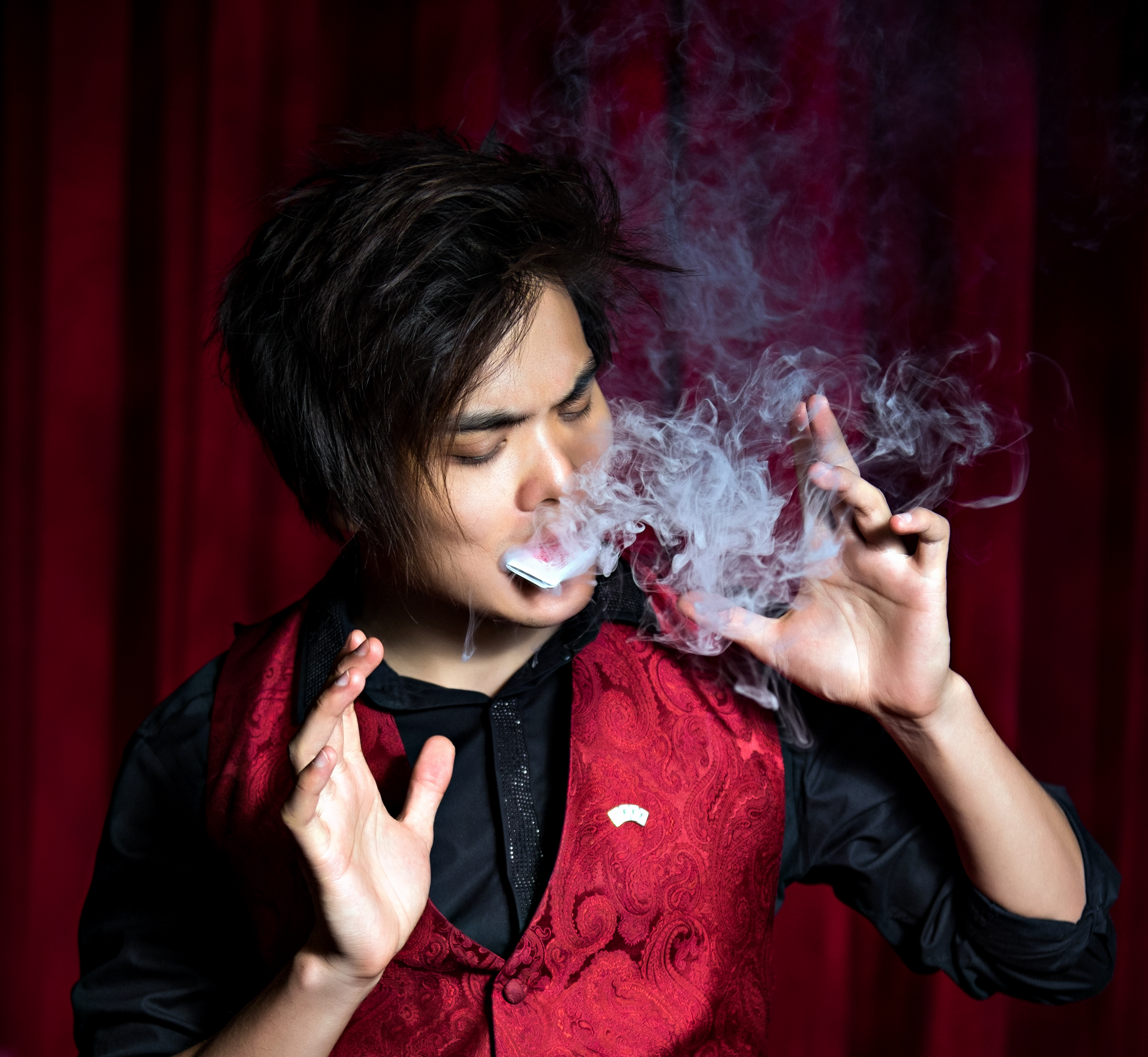
Shin Lim, season thirteen winner

The thirteenth season aired during 2018, between May 29 and September 19. Open auditions were held in late 2017 until early 2018, within Orlando, Cincinnati, Savannah, Milwaukee, Houston, Las Vegas, New York, Nashville and Los Angeles. The Judges' auditions were filmed in March 2018 at the Pasadena Civic Auditorium in Los Angeles. A minor change was made to the format of the Judge Cuts in terms of the number of participants in this stage from the auditions being reduced to seventy-two, with about eighteen performing each week. The guest judges featured in the Judge Cuts for the thirteenth season consisted of Ken Jeong, Olivia Munn, Martina McBride and Chris Hardwick. This season was won by magician Shin Lim, with acrobatic group Zurcaroh coming in second, and violinist Brian King Joseph placing third.

=== Season 14 (2019) ===
The fourteenth season aired during 2019, between May 28 and September 18. Following the previous season, Tyra Banks, Heidi Klum and Mel B, all opted to leave the program. Banks announced her resignation in December 2018, while Klum and Mel B announced their respective departures two months later. Due to this, replacements were sought in February 2019. Terry Crews was appointed as Banks' successor, following his role on the program's spin-off The Champions, while both Julianne Hough and Gabrielle Union were appointed as new judges for the upcoming season. Both auditions and filming began on March 3, 2019. On November 22, 2019, it was announced that Hough and Union were let go from the series, marking their only season as judges.

Along with the guest judges for the fourteenth season's Judge Cuts were Brad Paisley, Dwyane Wade, Ellie Kemper and Jay Leno. This season is notable for two additional guest judges being added for the live semi-finals: Sean Hayes and Queen Latifah. This season was won by singer and pianist Kodi Lee, with choir group Detroit Youth Choir coming in second, and stand-up comedian Ryan Niemiller placing third.

=== Season 15 (2020) ===
The fifteenth season aired during 2020, between May 26 and September 23. Following the previous season, replacements were made for Union and Hough, after both were let go from the program in November 2019. This resulted in the return of Heidi Klum, along with Sofía Vergara as a new judge. Although filming had begun by late February with auditions, the onset of COVID-19 pandemic in the United States towards March caused production delays. Live audiences were discontinued, per the advice against large gatherings by health experts. Production was eventually suspended after Klum fell ill during filming, raising concerns about the risk of infection. While production on the live rounds went under discussion, the program confirmed the season would premiere in May with audition episodes, after footage for these was completed and edited for broadcast.

Production for the remainder of the season resumed in mid-June, while the season was being broadcast. Several changes were made to minimize the potential for infection among those involved, including participants and judges. While the Judges Cuts round was drastically changed, effectively condensing the stage into a single episode, the live rounds featured several measures. These included being filmed at Universal Studios Hollywood, the use of a virtual audience, and an expansion in the number of quarter-finalists.

Prior to the first quarter-final, Cowell was seriously injured in an accident and absent from the remainder of the season. Guest judges appeared for two of the quarter-finals, before opting to maintain the use of three judges for the remainder of the episodes. The season was won by spoken word poet Brandon Leake, with country duo Broken Roots coming in second, and singer Cristina Rae placing third.

=== Season 16 (2021) ===
A sixteenth season was announced in late February 2021 by NBC, confirming both the host and its judges, including the return of Cowell. Production began after auditions were opened up with participants asked to provide these for judgment, either virtually or via recorded video. On March 9, 2021, it was announced that the season would premiere on June 1. This season was won by magician Dustin Tavella, with aerialist Aidan Bryant coming in second, and stand-up comedian Josh Blue placing third.

=== Season 17 (2022) ===
The seventeenth season was announced on March 31, 2022, with the same judging panel and host from the previous two seasons set to return. The season premiered on May 31, 2022. This season was won by dance group Mayyas, with pole dancer Kristy Sellars coming in second, and singer and guitarist Drake Milligan placing third.

=== Season 18 (2023) ===
The cast for the eighteenth season was revealed on March 3, 2023, with the same judging panel and host from the previous three seasons announced to be returning. The season premiered on May 30, 2023. This season was won by dog tricks act Adrian Stoica and Hurricane, with magician Anna DeGuzman coming in second, and dance group Murmuration placing third.

=== Season 19 (2024) ===
During the season eighteen finale on September 27, 2023, it was revealed that the series was officially renewed for a nineteenth season. The season premiered on May 28, 2024 with the full cast from the previous four seasons all returning.

A notable change in format occurred this season with the "Golden Buzzer" in the auditions and live shows. In the auditions, each judge received two "Golden Buzzers" to give out, up from the one each received since its adoption in 2014. Additionally, during the live shows, each judge was allowed one "Golden Buzzer" to give to an act, marking the first time this occurred on the American version of Got Talent.

This season was won by singer Richard Goodall, with dog tricks act Roni Sagi & Rhythm coming in second, and drone precision group Sky Elements placing third.

=== Season 20 (2025) ===
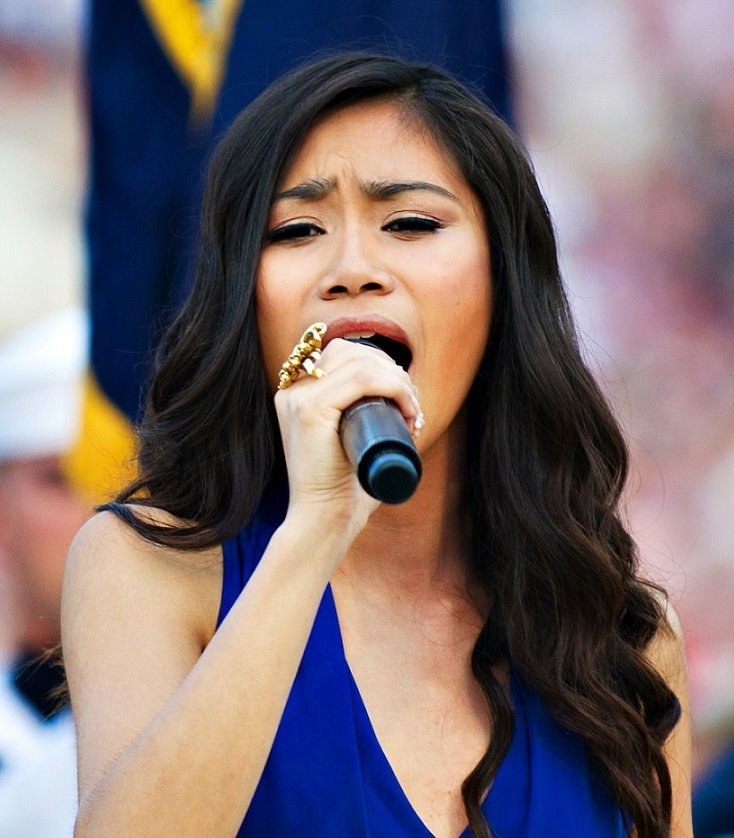
Jessica Sanchez, season twenty winner

On January 8, 2025, it was announced that auditions for America's Got Talent had been postponed until further notice due to the ongoing wildfires in Southern California, where the show is filmed. On February 3, 2025, it was revealed the twentieth season would premiere on May 27, 2025. Crews returned as host for his seventh season, and Mandel, Cowell, and Vergara returned as judges. Klum departed the panel and was replaced by Mel B, who returned after a six-season absence. This season was won by singer Jessica Sanchez, who previously competed on the first season of the series, being eliminated in the semifinals. Freestyle rapper Chris Turner placed in second, and singer Jourdan Blue placed in third.

=== Season 21 (2026) ===
Nene Royal, season twenty-one winner

On March 12, 2026, it was announced by NBC that the show had been renewed for a twenty-first season, with Crews returning to host for his eighth season, and Mandel, Cowell, Vergara and Mel B returning as judges. With the twenty-first season, Crews ties the record with Nick Cannon as longest serving host, as Cannon hosted the show for eight seasons. The season premiered on June 2, 2026.

Needing to undergo back surgery, judge Simon Cowell was absent from the season following the first Quarter-final round on August 18 and 19. While his spot was left vacant for the second Quarter-final round and the Semi-final round, three guest judges filled in for Cowell during the other rounds, consisting of Kenan Thompson (third Quarter-final round on September 1), Heidi Klum (final Quarter-final round on September 8), and KSI (finals on September 22 and 23).

This season was won by singer and guitarist Nene Royal, with magician Geno Ploeger coming in second, and magician group Hundred Fingers placing third.

== Related programs ==
=== America's Got Talent Live ===
In 2009, production staff opted for creating a post-show made up of the best finalists from that year's competition, and conducted over a ten-week run between October and January at the Planet Hollywood Resort and Casino in Las Vegas. Titled America's Got Talent Live, it featured performances by season four winner Kevin Skinner, and by ten of the finalists from that season. It was hosted by Jerry Springer, in between taping his self-named show in Stamford, Connecticut. The show proved a success and was renewed for 2010, with Springer remaining as host, and featuring the finalists of the fifth season. It was remade into a 25-city tour that began at the Caesars Palace Casino and Resort in Las Vegas, and concluded at the Bob Carr Performing Arts Center in Orlando.

The live show was put into hiatus following its 2010 run, and resumed in 2012 with a new host and performances from the finalists of the seventh season: Olate Dogs, Spencer Horsman, Joe Castillo, Lightwire Theater, David Garibaldi and his CMYK's, Jarrett and Raja, and Tom Cotter. In 2013, another tour was scheduled consisting of the best acts from the eighth season: Kenichi Ebina, and finalists Collins Key, Jimmy Rose, Taylor Williamson, Cami Bradley, The KriStef Brothers, and Tone the Chiefrocca. In 2014, a new tour was scheduled, consisting of performances from top finalists of the ninth season: Mat Franco, Emily West, Quintavious Johnson, AcroArmy, Emil and Dariel, Miguel Dakota, Sons of Serendip, and season 8's runner-up Taylor Williamson.

In 2015, America's Got Talent Live discontinued operating as a live tour, instead functioning as a series of shows at the Planet Hollywood Resort in Las Vegas. Performances from the top acts from the tenth season included winner Paul Zerdin, runner-up Drew Lynch, and fan favorite Piff the Magic Dragon. In 2016, four more shows were scheduled at the same venue, and featured performances from the top acts of the eleventh season's final: Grace VanderWaal, The Clairvoyants and Tape Face. In 2017, another four shows were scheduled at the same venue, and featured performances by the top acts of the twelfth season's final: Darci Lynne, Angelica Hale, Light Balance and Preacher Lawson. In 2018, three new shows were scheduled at a new venue in Las Vegas, and featured the top acts from the thirteenth season: Shin Lim, Samuel J. Comroe, Courtney Hadwin, Vicki Barbolak and Duo Transcend.

=== Holiday specials ===
In 2016, NBC commissioned a festive two-hour special of the program, titled America's Got Talent Holiday Spectacular. Broadcast at the Dolby Theatre on December 19, 2016, the special was hosted by Nick Cannon and featured a mixture of performances by acts that had participated across the program's history with several special guests. Among those involved were Grace VanderWaal, Jackie Evancho, Andra Day, Penn & Teller, Pentatonix, Terry Fator, Mat Franco, Piff the Magic Dragon, Olate Dogs, Professor Splash and Jon Dorenbos (as well as the judges from the season 11). The special proved a ratings hit, achieving around 9.5 million viewers during its broadcast.

In 2018, NBC commissioned a second special centered on Darci Lynne, the winner of the twelfth season. Titled Darci Lynne: My Hometown Christmas, it was hosted by Farmer, and involved Lonnie Chavis from This Is Us as the special's announcer. It broadcast at the Alex Theatre on December 11, 2018. The special featured a special sketch involving Farmer and that season's judges: Simon Cowell, Howie Mandel, Heidi Klum and Mel B. A series of duets included Farmer with Lindsey Stirling, Toby Keith and Kristin Chenoweth, respectively. Guest performances were by Pentatonix and Hunter Hayes.

=== America's Got Talent: The Champions ===
In May 2018, NBC commissioned executive producer and Got Talent creator Simon Cowell with producing an all-star spin-off competition, titled America's Got Talent: The Champions. Cowell had conceived of an idea for a global competition consisting of participants that had appeared across the Got Talent franchise across the years, including notable acts and winners. The format for the spin-off would be similar to the main program, though episodes would be pre-recorded when the spin-off contest was held in autumn, and then later broadcast during the network's winter schedule.

The spin-off premiered in January 2019, and as of February 2020, has aired two seasons. AGT season 13 winner Shin Lim, and AGT season 14 finalists V.Unbeatable, won their respective season's contest.

=== AGT: Extreme ===
On May 14, 2021, NBC announced its second spin-off of the main AGT show, with a focus on daredevil acts. Got Talent creator Cowell serves as an executive producer and judge for the series. Originally planned for a mid-season summer 2021 debut, filming for the series occurred at the Atlanta Motor Speedway between September 27 and October 20, 2021, and wrapped in early January 2022.

On October 1, 2021, main series host Terry Crews was announced to continue the role in the spin-off, with former WWE wrestler Nikki Bella and motorsports competitor Travis Pastrana to join Cowell as judges. The series premiered on February 21, 2022.

=== America's Got Talent: All-Stars ===
On October 7, 2022, NBC announced its third spin-off of the main AGT show. Similar to America's Got Talent: The Champions, America's Got Talent: All-Stars features winners, finalists, fan favorites, and others from previous seasons of AGT across the Got Talent franchise, competing for the All-Star title. The series, with judges Simon Cowell, Heidi Klum, and Howie Mandel as well as host Terry Crews, began production in October 2022, and premiered on January 2, 2023.

=== AGT: Fantasy League ===
On September 21, 2023, the fourth spin-off for the AGT series was announced. AGT: Fantasy League features the judges competing in a fantasy sports draft-like competition, mentoring the acts to attempt to get an act from their own team be crowned champion. Mel B, who last appeared in the franchise in the first season of America's Got Talent: The Champions in 2019, returns to judge alongside other returning judges Simon Cowell, Heidi Klum, and Howie Mandel, with Terry Crews returning to host as well. On November 15, 2023, it was announced that AGT: Fantasy League would premiere on January 1, 2024.

== Reception ==
=== U.S. television ratings ===
Since the show began, its ratings have been very high, ranging from 9 million viewers to as many as 16 million viewers (generally averaging around 12 million viewers). The show has also ranked high in the 18–49 demographic, usually rating anywhere from as low as 1.6 to as high as 4.6 throughout its run. Audition shows and performance shows rate higher on average than results shows.

Although the show's ratings have been high, the network typically keeps the show's run limited to before the official start of the next television season in the third week of September, with some reductions or expansions depending on Olympic years. Finale ratings are usually lower due to returning programming on other networks.

The highest rated season in overall viewers to date is season four (2009). The most-watched episode has been the finale of season five (2010), with 16.41 million viewers. The series premiere and an episode featuring the first part of Las Vegas Week in season six (2011) have each tied for highest rating among adults 18–49, both having a 4.6 rating.

| Season | Premiered | | Ended | | TV season | Timeslot (ET) | Season viewers | Season ranking |
| Season | Date | Viewers (in millions) | Date | Viewers (in millions) | TV season | Timeslot (ET) | Season viewers | Season ranking |
|---|---|---|---|---|---|---|---|---|
| 1 | June 21, 2006 | 12.41 | Final Performances: August 16, 2006 | | 2005–06 | Wednesday 8:00 pm | | 1 |
| 1 | June 21, 2006 | 12.41 | Season Finale: August 17, 2006 | 12.05 | 2005–06 | Thursday 9:00 pm | | 1 |
| 2 | June 5, 2007 | 12.93 | Final Performances: August 20, 2007 | | 2006–07 | Tuesday 8:00 pm | | 1 |
| 2 | June 5, 2007 | 12.93 | Season Finale: August 21, 2007 | 13.87 | 2006–07 | Tuesday 8:00 pm | | 1 |
| 3 | June 17, 2008 | 12.80 | Final Performances: September 30, 2008 | 10.23 | 2007–08 | Tuesday 9:00 pm (June 17 – August 5); Tuesday 8:00 pm (after August 26) | | 1 |
| 3 | June 17, 2008 | 12.80 | Season Finale: October 1, 2008 | 12.55 | 2007–08 | Wednesday 9:00 pm (after August 27) | | 1 |
| 4 | June 23, 2009 | 11.30 | Final Performances: September 15, 2009 | 13.84 | 2008–09 | Tuesday 9:00 pm | | 1 |
| 4 | June 23, 2009 | 11.30 | Season Finale: September 16, 2009 | 15.53 | 2008–09 | Wednesday 9:00 pm | | 1 |
| 5 | June 1, 2010 | 12.35 | Final Performances: September 14, 2010 | 14.60 | 2009–10 | Tuesday 9:00 pm | | 1 |
| 5 | June 1, 2010 | 12.35 | Season Finale: September 15, 2010 | 16.41 | 2009–10 | Wednesday 9:00 pm | | 1 |
| 6 | May 31, 2011 | 15.28 | Final Performances: September 13, 2011 | 13.67 | 2010–11 | Tuesday 8:00 pm (May 31 – July 5); Tuesday 9:00 pm (after July 5) | 12.65 | 1 |
| 6 | May 31, 2011 | 15.28 | Season Finale: September 14, 2011 | 14.37 | 2010–11 | Wednesday 9:00 pm (after June 22) | 11.49 | 1 |
| 7 | May 14, 2012 | 10.48 | Final Performances: September 12, 2012 | 11.05 | 2011-12 | Monday 8:00 pm (May 14 – July 3); Tuesday 8:00 pm (after July 3) | 10.48 | 1 |
| 7 | May 14, 2012 | 10.48 | Season Finale: September 13, 2012 | 10.59 | 2011-12 | Tuesday 9:00 pm (May 14 – July 3); Wednesday 9:00 pm (after July 3) | 10.58 | 1 |
| 8 | June 4, 2013 | 12.41 | Final Performances: September 17, 2013 | 11.19 | 2012–13 | Tuesday 8:00 pm | 11.22 | 1 |
| 8 | June 4, 2013 | 12.41 | Season Finale: September 18, 2013 | 11.49 | 2012–13 | Wednesday 8:00 pm (after July 10) | 10.34 | 1 |
| 9 | May 27, 2014 | 12.00 | Final Performances: September 16, 2014 | 11.46 | 2013–14 | Tuesday 8:00 pm (May 27 – July 15); Tuesday 9:00 pm (after July 22) | 10.31 | 1 |
| 9 | May 27, 2014 | 12.00 | Season Finale: September 17, 2014 | 12.21 | 2013–14 | Wednesday 9:00 pm (after July 23) | 10.37 | 1 |
| 10 | May 26, 2015 | 11.09 | Final Performances: September 15, 2015 | 11.33 | 2014–15 | Tuesday 8:00 pm | 10.70 | 1 |
| 10 | May 26, 2015 | 11.09 | Season Finale: September 16, 2015 | 9.54 | 2014–15 | Wednesday 8:00 pm (after August 12) | 9.07 | 1 |
| 11 | May 31, 2016 | 11.67 | Final Performances: September 13, 2016 | 13.97 | 2015–16 | Tuesday 8:00 pm | 11.71 | 1 |
| 11 | May 31, 2016 | 11.67 | Season Finale: September 14, 2016 | 14.41 | 2015–16 | Wednesday 8:00 pm (after July 5) | 10.97 | 1 |
| 12 | May 30, 2017 | 12.37 | Final Performances: September 19, 2017 | 14.70 | 2016–17 | Tuesday 8:00 pm | 12.90 | 1 |
| 12 | May 30, 2017 | 12.37 | Season Finale: September 20, 2017 | 15.64 | 2016–17 | Wednesday 8:00 pm (after August 9) | 12.00 | 1 |
| 13 | May 29, 2018 | 12.16 | Final Performances: September 18, 2018 | 12.99 | 2017–18 | Tuesday 8:00 pm | 11.43 | 1 |
| 13 | May 29, 2018 | 12.16 | Season Finale: September 19, 2018 | 12.88 | 2017–18 | Wednesday 8:00 pm (after August 15) | 10.39 | 1 |
| 14 | May 28, 2019 | 9.75 | Final Performances: September 17, 2019 | 9.88 | 2018–19 | Tuesday 8:00 pm | 9.51 | |
| 14 | May 28, 2019 | 9.75 | Season Finale: September 18, 2019 | 10.21 | 2018–19 | Wednesday 8:00 pm (after August 14) | 8.56 | |
| 15 | May 26, 2020 | 9.88 | Final Performances: September 22, 2020 | 6.16 | 2019–20 | Tuesday 8:00 pm | 7.29 | |
| 15 | May 26, 2020 | 9.88 | Season Finale: September 23, 2020 | 6.57 | 2019–20 | Wednesday 8:00 pm (after August 12) | 5.62 | |
| 16 | June 1, 2021 | 7.37 | Final Performances: September 14, 2021 | 7.42 | 2020–21 | Tuesday 8:00 pm | 6.60 | |
| 16 | June 1, 2021 | 7.37 | Season Finale: September 15, 2021 | 6.39 | 2020–21 | Wednesday 8:00 pm (after August 11) | 6.60 | |
| 17 | May 31, 2022 | 6.33 | Final Performances: September 13, 2022 | 7.03 | 2021–22 | Tuesday 8:00 pm | 6.17 | |
| 17 | May 31, 2022 | 6.33 | Season Finale: September 14, 2022 | 6.82 | 2021–22 | Wednesday 8:00 pm (after August 10) | 6.17 | |
| 18 | May 30, 2023 | 6.11 | Final Performances: September 26, 2023 | 5.54 | 2022–23 | Tuesday 8:00 pm | | |
| 18 | May 30, 2023 | 6.11 | Season Finale: September 27, 2023 | 5.36 | 2022–23 | Wednesday 8:00 pm (after August 22) | | |
| 19 | May 28, 2024 | 5.33 | Final Performances: September 17, 2024 | 4.83 | 2023–24 | Tuesday 8:00 pm | | |
| 19 | May 28, 2024 | 5.33 | Season Finale: September 24, 2024 | 5.46 | 2023–24 | Wednesday 8:00 pm (after August 13) | | |
| 20 | May 27, 2025 | 4.81 | Final Performances: September 23, 2025 | 4.36 | 2024–25 | Tuesday 8:00 pm | | |
| 20 | May 27, 2025 | 4.81 | Season Finale: September 24, 2025 | 4.26 | 2024–25 | Wednesday 8:00 pm (after August 20) | | |
| 21 | June 2, 2026 | 4.86 | Final Performances: September 22, 2026 | 3.90 | 2025–26 | Tuesday 8:00 pm | | |
| 21 | June 2, 2026 | 4.86 | Season Finale: September 23, 2026 | 4.07 | 2025–26 | Wednesday 8:00 pm (after August 19) | | |

=== Awards and nominations ===
| Year | Association | Category | Result | Ref. |
|---|---|---|---|---|
| 2011 | People's Choice Awards | Favorite Competition Show | Nominated | |
| 2011 | Kids' Choice Awards | Favorite Reality Show | Nominated | |
| 2011 | Primetime Emmy Awards | Outstanding Hairstyling For A Multi-Camera Series Or Special | Nominated | |
| 2012 | Kids' Choice Awards | Favorite Reality Show | Nominated | |
| 2012 | Teen Choice Awards | Choice Summer TV Show | Nominated | |
| 2012 | Teen Choice Awards | Choice Male TV Personality: Nick Cannon | Nominated | |
| 2013 | Kids' Choice Awards | Favorite Reality Show | Nominated | |
| 2014 | People's Choice Awards | Favorite TV Competition Show | Nominated | |
| 2014 | Kids' Choice Awards | Favorite Reality Show | Nominated | |
| 2015 | People's Choice Awards | Favorite TV Competition Show | Nominated | |
| 2015 | Kids' Choice Awards | Favorite Talent Competition Show | Nominated | |
| 2016 | People's Choice Awards | Favorite TV Competition Show | Nominated | |
| 2016 | Kids' Choice Awards | Favorite Talent Competition Show | Nominated | |
| 2017 | Critics' Choice Awards | Best Reality Series - Competition | Nominated | |
| 2017 | People's Choice Awards | Favorite TV Competition Show | Nominated | |
| 2017 | Kids' Choice Awards | Favorite Reality Show | Won | |
| 2018 | Critics' Choice Awards | Best Reality Series - Competition | Nominated | |
| 2019 | Kids' Choice Awards | Best Reality Show | Won | |
| 2019 | Kids' Choice Awards | Favorite TV Judges: Simon Cowell, Heidi Klum, Mel B, Howie Mandel | Won | |
| 2019 | Kids' Choice Awards | Favorite TV Host: Tyra Banks | Nominated | |
| 2019 | Teen Choice Awards | Choice Reality TV Show | Won | |
| 2019 | People's Choice Awards | Favorite TV Competition Show | Won | |
| 2020 | Kids' Choice Awards | Favorite Reality Show | Won | |
| 2020 | Kids' Choice Awards | Favorite TV Host: Terry Crews | Nominated | |
| 2021 | Kids' Choice Awards | Favorite Reality Show | Won | |
| 2022 | Kids' Choice Awards | Favorite Reality Show | Won | |
| 2022 | People's Choice Awards | The Competition Show of 2022 | Nominated | |
| 2023 | Kids' Choice Awards | Favorite Reality Show | Nominated | |
| 2024 | People's Choice Awards | The Competition Show of the Year | Nominated | |
| 2024 | Kids' Choice Awards | Favorite Reality Show | Won | |
| 2025 | Kids' Choice Awards | Favorite Reality TV Show | Won | |
| 2026 | Kids' Choice Awards | Favorite TV Show Reality Competition | Won | |

== See also ==
- Got Talent
- The X Factor
