= HK International Comedy Festival =

The Hong Kong International Comedy Festival (traditional Chinese: 香港國際喜劇節; simplified Chinese: 香港国际喜剧节) is an annual comedy festival in Hong Kong. It was founded in 2007 by the stand-up comedian Jami Gong.

== History ==
The festival was founded in 2007 by the stand-up comedian Jami Gong, who is the founder of The TakeOut Comedy Club Hong Kong. As he was in an airplane, he thought of the idea of creating a film festival and wrote his thoughts on a sickness bag. The first competition featured 20 Hong Kong comedians. The festival has expanded to include comedians from all over the world. Participants in the film festival include the American Tom Cotter, the American Chad Daniels, South African Barry Hilton, the Hong Konger Vivek Mahbubani, the Briton John Moloney, the American Paul Ogata, the American Dwayne Perkins, and the American Tom Segura. (Note: For Tom Cotter; For Chad Daniels; For Barry Hilton; For Vivek Mahbubani; For John Moloney; For Paul Ogata; For Dwayne Perkins; For Tom Segura)

There are separate English and Chinese language competitions with the latter having only a few participants so is substantially tinier. The festival also includes a weekend featuring improvisational comedy. A panel of judges determines the winner based on three categories: how innovative the material is, how the listeners respond, and the quality of their stage presence. The prize in 2013 was US$5,000 and three performance opportunities.

On 31 August 2014, journalist Linda Kennedy's profile of the festival was broadcast on the BBC's The Arts Hour television programme. The Straits Times in 2016 called it "one of Asia's largest comedy festivals". In 2016, the 22-year-old Malaysian comedian Hannan Azlan became the first woman and the youngest person to win.

== Winners ==
Hong Kong International Comedy Competition (English Competition)
Year	Host	Winner	1st Runner Up	2nd Runner Up
2007	Paul Ogata	Tom Schmidt	Chris Musni	Dean Rainey
2008	Tom Cotter	Vivek Mahbubani		
2009	Kerri Louise	Ashley Strand	Stuart Schofield	Umar Rana
2010	Shecky Wong	Andrew Chu	GB Labrador	Chris Musni
2011	Butch Bradley	Tama Churchouse	Jinx Yeo	Alex Milner
2012	Ruben Paul	Rishi Budhrani	Joanna Sio	Turner Sparks
2013	Paul Ogata	Jason Leong	Jim Brewsky	Ryan Hynek
2014	Tom Cotter	Jim Brewsky	Alex Milner	William Childress
2015	Gina Yashere	Drew Fralick	Turner Sparks	Garron Chiu & Benjamin Quinlan (Tie)
2016	Paul Ogata	Hannan Azlan	Ben Quinlan	Garron Chiu
2017	Ahmed Ahmed	Ben Quinlan	Andrew Chu	Garron Chiu
2018	Barry Hilton	Garron Chiu	Storm Xu	Andy Curtain
2019	*No show held due to Hong Kong protests			
2020	*No show held due to COVID-19 lockdown			
2021	Jami Gong	Pete Grella	Steve Lee	Kari Gunnarsson
2022	*No show held due to COVID-19 lockdown			

Hong Kong International Comedy Competition (Cantonese Competition)
Year	Winner
2007	Vivek Mahbubani
2008	Fab
2009	Yebi Hu
2010	Chris M
2011	Chan Lok Tim
2012	Fab
	*2012 was the final year for the Cantonese portion of the Comedy Festival
