= Anna Graceman =

American musician

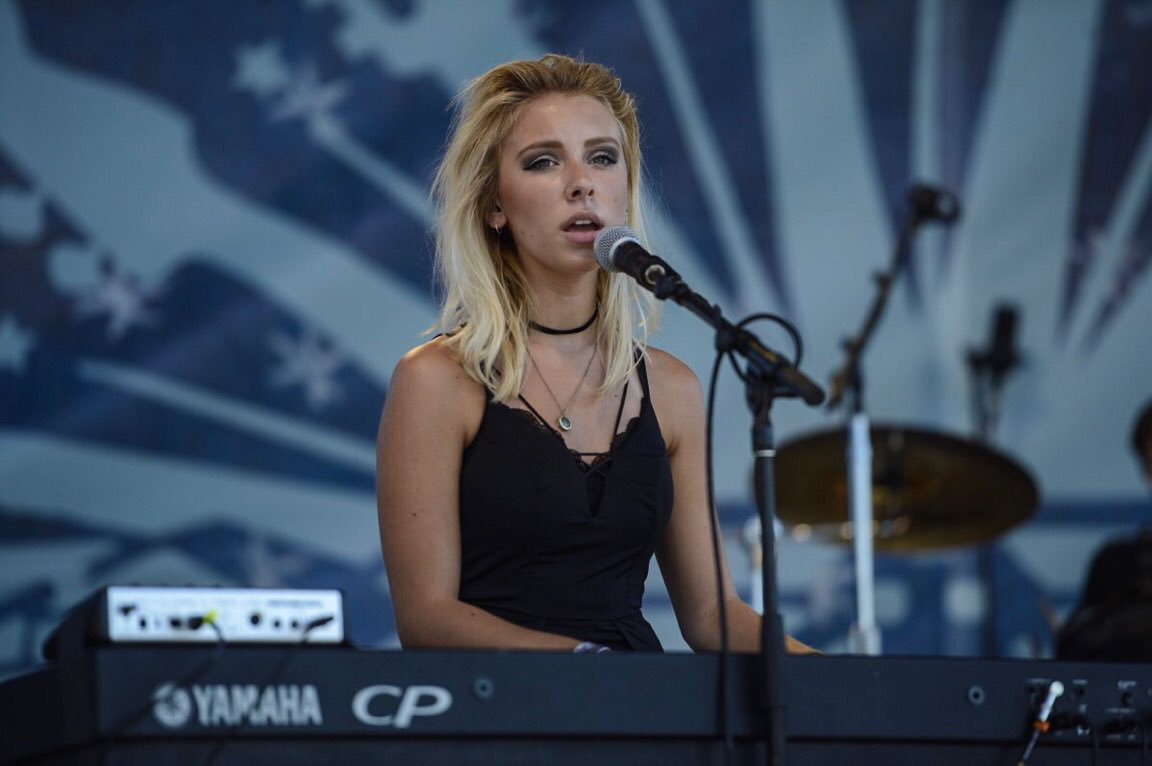
- Anna Graceman performing at the Pilgrimage Festival in September 2016

Background information
- Also known as: Anna Grace
- Born: Juneau, Alaska, U.S.
- Origin: Southeast Alaska, U.S.
- Genres: Folk, rock, soul
- Occupations: Singer, songwriter, musician, producer
- Instruments: Vocals; piano; guitar; bass guitar
- Years active: 2009–present
- Label: Another Girl Records
- Website: annagraceman.com

Anna Graceman is an American singer, songwriter, producer, and recording artist whose self-penned songs and music have garnered national recognition. She has been featured on The Ellen DeGeneres Show, America's Got Talent, CBS News, and Songland.

== Life and career ==
=== Early life ===
Anna Graceman was born in Juneau, Alaska, to a poor family. Her mother played classical music to her before she was born, and at three months old, her parents displayed flashcards for her to read and gain word association, sparking her love of songwriting. By the time she was 18 months old, she had memorized the lyrics of many classical and modern tunes. Graceman could play piano by age four and wrote her first song, "So I Cried", when she was six years old. Graceman has cited her mom as one of her biggest musical influences.

=== 2009–2010: Career beginnings ===
Graceman's parents began uploading videos of Graceman singing when she was six or seven years old. When Graceman's original song "Paradise" was uploaded in August 2009—when she was nine years old—a YouTube producer featured her in a group of child musicians. The video then caught the attention of Ellen DeGeneres, who invited Graceman to sing "Paradise" on The Ellen DeGeneres Show in October 2009. During that episode, DeGeneres invited Graceman to meet Taylor Swift on a subsequent show.

On April 20, 2010, Graceman played at the 36th Alaska Folk Festival along with other folk and bluegrass bands. A local reviewer stated, "There were several sets where the young and gifted stole the show, making me realize I was watching Juneau's version of "Who's Got Talent" – particularly when 10-year-old Anna Graceman sang all her original songs."

=== 2011: America's Got Talent ===
In 2011, when Graceman was 11 years old, she auditioned for season six of America's Got Talent, singing "If I Ain't Got You" by Alicia Keys and accompanying herself on the keyboard. She received a standing ovation from Howie Mandel, Piers Morgan, and Sharon Osbourne, the show's three judges. Her audition video went viral and caught the attention of the mainstream press.

In the Vegas round, Graceman performed "Rolling in the Deep" by Adele, again playing the keyboard. In the quarterfinals, she performed "What a Wonderful World" by Louis Armstrong, which earned her enough votes to qualify for the semifinals. Her self-accompanied performance of "Home Sweet Home" by Mötley Crüe in the semifinals earned her another standing ovation from the judges and a spot in the top 10. The performance caught the attention of Nikki Sixx, Mötley Crüe's bassist, who called it "so cute".

Graceman sang "True Colors" by Cyndi Lauper for her top 10 performance, but for the first time on the show, she performed without the keyboard. She finished in the bottom five of the top ten, failing to make the finals.

Following her elimination, Graceman participated in America's Got Talent Live in late October 2011 along with other season six favorites, including Landon Swank, Team iLuminate, and winner Landau Eugene Murphy, Jr. At the request of Caesars Palace, she returned to the Colosseum for the following New Year's Eve concert.

=== 2012–2015: Solo work after America's Got Talent ===
In 2012, Disney approached Graceman and requested the right to non-exclusively license her early original YouTube videos, which can be found in the video section of Disney's website.

In 2013, Graceman performed 43 shows at The Palazzo Theater in The Venetian for seven weeks. Famed reporter Robin Leach praised her performance, comparing her singing to Alicia Keys, her piano playing to Elton John, and her songwriting to Adele and Taylor Swift.

In April 2013, Graceman received an honorable mention from the International Songwriting Competition for her song "Showtime". Graceman moved to Nashville, Tennessee, in 2014 to pursue her songwriting and work with the musicians there.

On August 28, 2014, Graceman performed at the first YouTube Music Night at the YoutubeSpaceLA facilities in Los Angeles. A few months later, she performed at the YouTube Music Night at the Pinewood Social Event Center in downtown Nashville.

=== 2016–present: Graceman Band and Songland ===
Graceman was featured in Relix's September 2016 issue, where they wrote, "This is hardly a run-of-the-mill adolescence, Graceman has stayed grounded through it all, remembering where she came from and how it all started.".

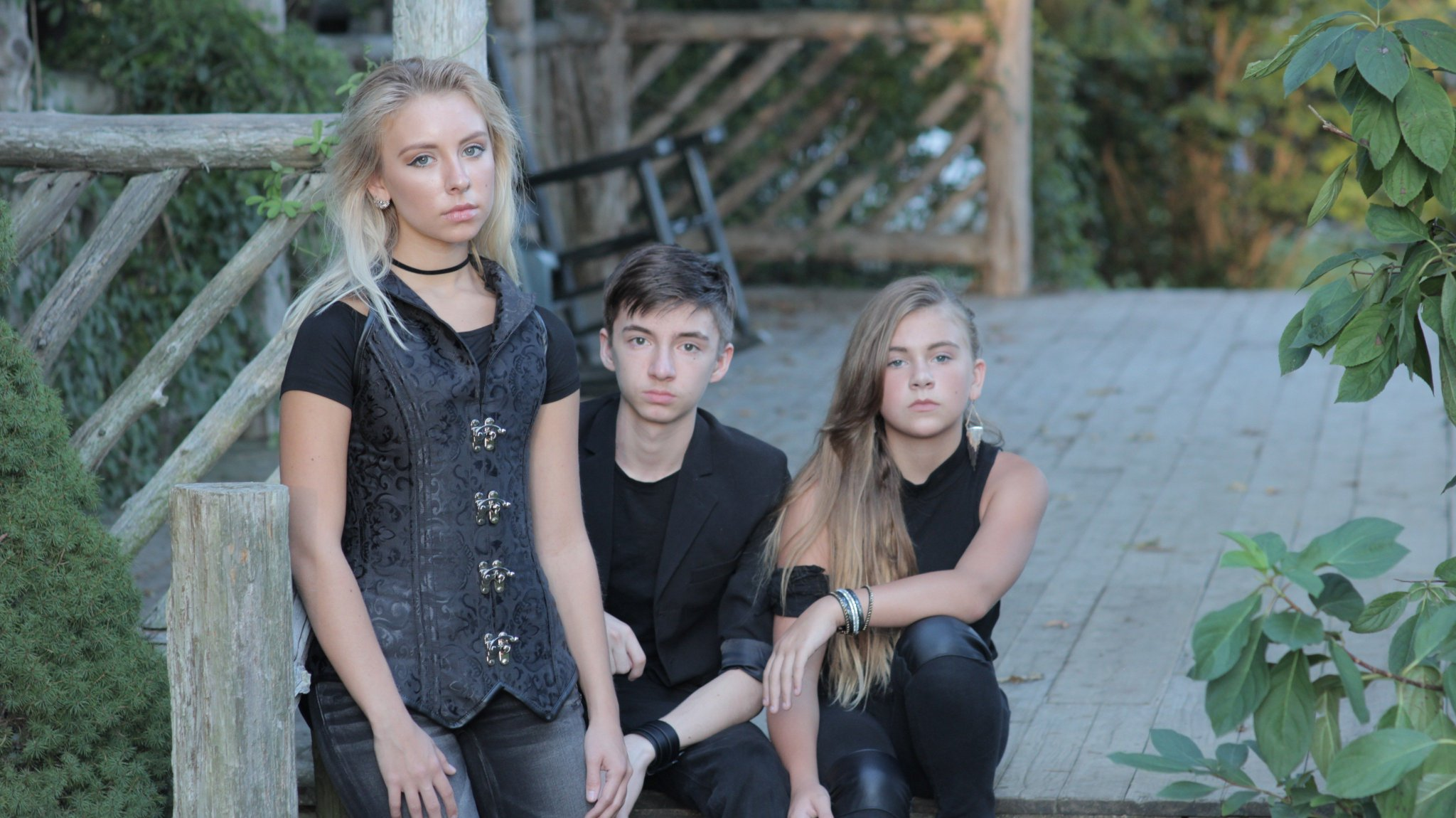
Anna, Allie, and Landon Graceman, 2016

In 2016, Graceman formed Graceman Band with her younger siblings, Allie and Landon Graceman. The band's style of music incorporates elements of folk, soul, and rock. Its members are:

- Anna Graceman – lead vocals, piano, keyboard, bass
- Allie Graceman – guitar, backing vocals
- Landon Graceman – drums, percussion

On September 21, 2016, Anna Graceman and her band appeared on NBC to promote the second annual Pilgrimage Music and Cultural Festival in Franklin, Tennessee, alongside renowned musicians such as The Struts and Kacey Musgraves. A couple of weeks later, Anna Graceman released the band's first full-length album, Rebel Days, written and produced by Anna Graceman.

On June 1, 2020, Graceman appeared on NBC's show Songland. The episode featured recording artist Bebe Rexha, who combined Graceman's song with that of fellow contestant Greg Scott and chose the song as the episode's winner. The song was recorded by Rexha and used by NBC to promote the Tokyo Olympics.

On May 29, 2020, Graceman released her studio album The Way The Night Behaves through her independent label, Another Girl Records.

In 2023, Anna Graceman and her band collaborated with Ryan Corn on "A Little Wild".

== Musical influences ==
Graceman credits Ann Wilson of Heart, Amy Winehouse, and Adele as her main inspirations.

== Discography ==
=== Studio albums ===
Title	Album details
Anna Graceman	Artist: Anna Graceman; Released: September 25, 2012; Label: Another Girl Records (Self-Published); Formats: CD, digital download
Rebel Days	Artist: Graceman; Released: October 4, 2016; Label: Another Girl Records (Self-Published); Formats: digital download
The Way The Night Behaves	Artist: Graceman; Released: May 29, 2020; Label: Another Girl Records (Self-Published); Formats: digital download
