= Hannan Azlan =

Malaysian stand-up comedian

- Occupation: Stand-up comedian
- Years active: 2015-present
- Website: hannanazlan.com

Hannan Azlan is a Malaysian stand-up comedian and ukulele player.

== Early life ==
Azlan was born in England and grew up in Ampang, Malaysia. By the age of 17, she knew she wanted to be an entertainer, initially focusing on theater and music. She started experimenting with stand-up comedy and began developing routines in 2015. By 2016, she was performing stand-up at local comedy clubs full-time.

== Career ==
Azlan made her international comedy debut at the Singapore Fringe Festival in 2016. The same year, she became the first woman and youngest comedian to win the Hong Kong International Comedy Competition at the age of 22. She has also performed multiple times at the Melbourne International Comedy Festival. Azlan has also performed as the opening act for fellow Malaysian comedian Ronny Chieng, who is a senior correspondent on Comedy Central's The Daily Show.

Azlan is known for playing on a ukulele and performing in a melodic voice during her routines. Azlan's performances contrasts her comic songs with edgier material, while also "skewer[ing] sexism, racism and gender stereotypes". Comedian Jami Gong describes Azlan's act as "quite unique, definitely unusual, with the ukulele, funny, funny songs, charisma, stage presence – people love her". Nylon has also praised Azlan for not relying on jokes about her own ethnicity or other stereotypes to be successful.

In 2019, Azlan appeared on Comedy Central Stand-Up, Asia! for its fourth season.

== Awards ==
Azlan was shortlisted for the Women of the Future Awards Southeast Asia in the category of Arts and Culture.
