= Vivek Mahbubani =

Hong Kong comedian (born 1982)

- Born: Vivek Ashok Mahbubani; 25 September 1982 (age 44); Hong Kong

Comedy career
- Years active: 2005–present
- Medium: Stand-up comedian
- Website: vivekmahbubani.com funnyvivek.com

Vivek Ashok Mahbubani (born 25 September 1982) (Note: Vivek Mahbubani felt surprised because of the unexpected birthday celebration by his friends in 2012: 棟篤笑阿差 Vivek Mahbubani 嘅 birthday surprise! on YouTube) a.k.a. Ah V (Chinese: 阿V), is a Hong Kong stand-up comedian and a musician.

== Biography ==
Vivek was born and raised in Hong Kong, and is of Sindhi South Asian ancestry. He grew up in an Indian household where he spoke English and says he faced a lot of cultural challenges because he was surrounded by non-Indians. He graduated from Diocesan Boys’ School and City University of Hong Kong with a degree in creative media in 2005 and currently runs his own design firm.

Vivek is also a stand-up comedian, performing in both English and Cantonese. He is a regular headliner and host at The TakeOut Comedy Club Hong Kong. In 2007, Vivek won the Cantonese-language category of the competition to find Hong Kong's funniest person and was a finalist in the English language category. In 2008, Vivek won the English language category of the competition. Vivek is the drummer and an original member of Eve of Sin, a Metalcore band based in Hong Kong. As of September 2016 the band is on a hiatus.

In 2008, Vivek was hired by Citibank to endorse its mobile financial services in Hong Kong. In 2010, Vivek was the official announcer for Hong Kong's first Mixed Martial Arts event hosted by Legend Fighting Championship.

== See also ==
- HK International Comedy Festival
- The TakeOut Comedy Club Hong Kong
- Gill Mohindepaul Singh (also known as Q Bobo)
