= Olate Dogs =

American dog trick act

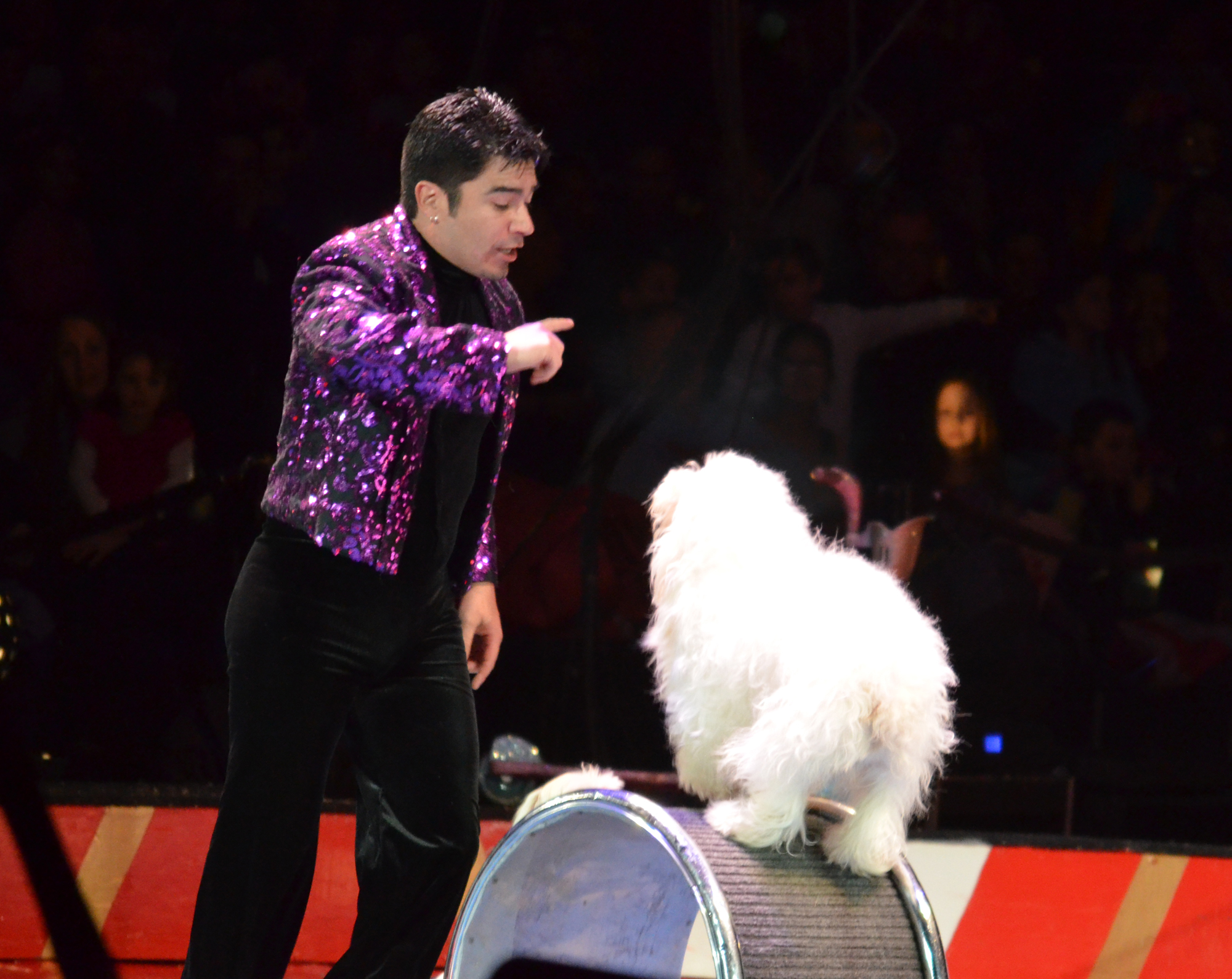
Nicholas Olate gives instructions to a dog balancing atop a large wheel, February 16, 2013.

Olate Dogs (originally Olate Family's Dogs) is an American dog trick act featuring father-and-son trainers Richard and Nicholas Olate. The group won the seventh season (2012) of America's Got Talent, claiming the US$1,000,000 first prize.

Richard Olate grew up in Santiago, Chile, where he adopted a stray dog and taught it tricks. He soon adopted more dogs and started a dog act. His brother Jose joined the act and the two caught the attention of a circus promoter. They came to America in 1989 and found success as part of Circus Vargas. Richard got married and eventually his wife Rebecca and son Nicholas and daughter Brandy joined the act. Olate Dogs performed in the Big Apple Circus and Ringling Bros. and Barnum & Bailey Circus. They appeared in TV commercials and on multiple morning programs before becoming national stars on America's Got Talent. Subsequently, they have toured the country and performed during NBA halftimes.

Olate Dogs features four different five-minute acts that include numerous tricks such as dogs jumping rope, going down slides, and riding scooters. The act also features a dog conga line and another that does back flips. Up to 10 of their 22 dogs perform during each show.

== Background ==
Richard Olate is a third-generation circus performer who grew up in Santiago, Chile. The second youngest of 22 children, he grew up in poverty. As a young child, he found a stray dog in the street, adopted it, and began to teach it tricks. Soon he adopted two more dogs and trained them as well. By age 12, he was supporting his family with a dog act, performing in schools and small circuses. Richard's brother Jose joined the act and the duo caught the attention of circus promoters. In 1989, Richard and Jose Olate brought their act to the United States. That year, the Chicago Tribune described their Circus Vargas performance as "clever and comical".

Shortly after coming to America, Richard Olate met Rebecca Smith, a circus performer who performed as a human cannonball. The two fell in love, despite speaking different languages, and got married. Rebecca gave up her act and began assisting with the dog act instead. Richard and Rebecca had three children. The older two Olate children returned to Chile, where Richard's daughter and her fiancé run a circus, and his older son works as a chef. His younger son, Nicholas, grew up with the dogs and became an integral part of the act at age 15. Nicholas Olate was hyperactive as a child, learning dance and tumbling at a young age.

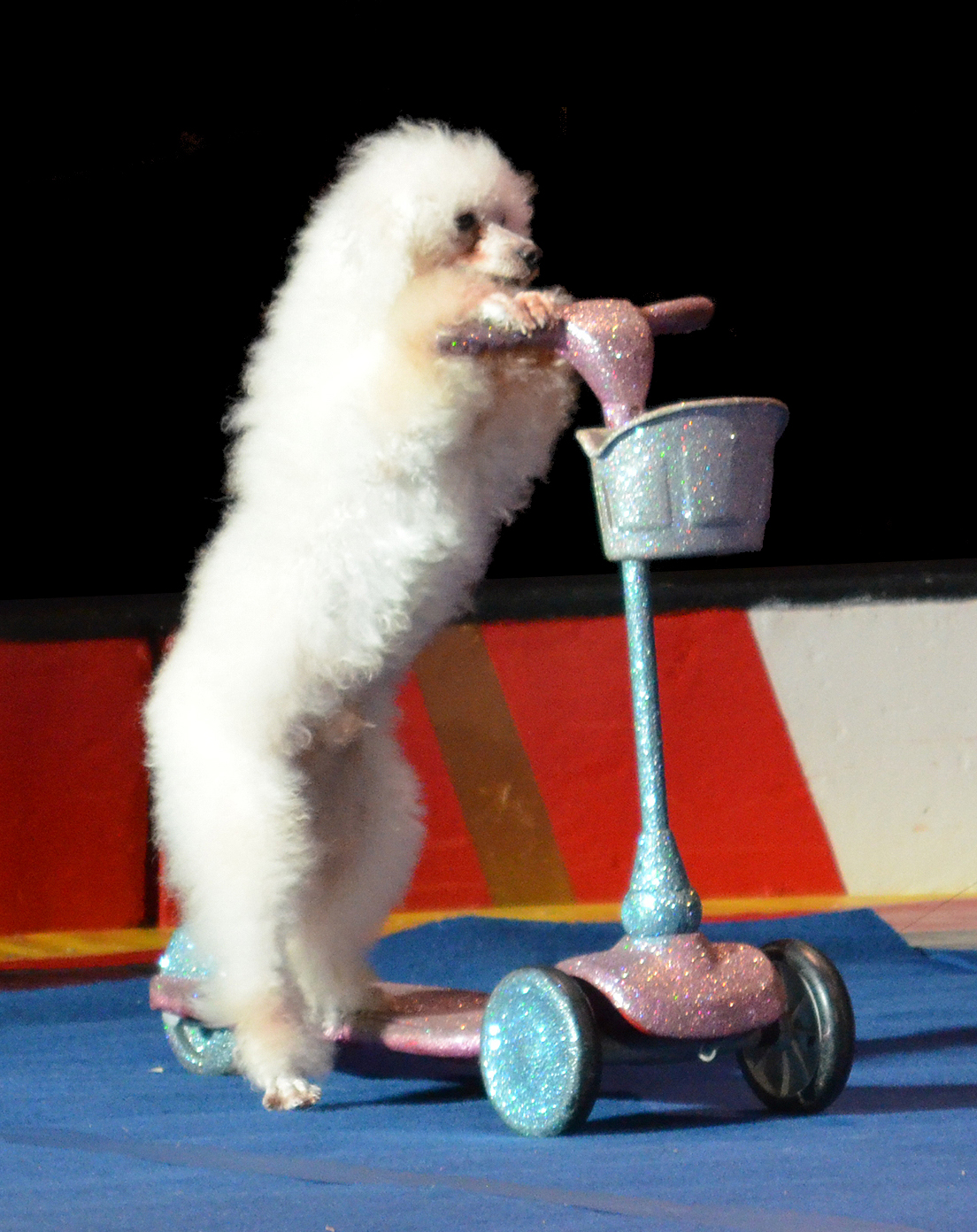
A dog prepares to ride a scooter during an Olate Dogs performance on February 16, 2013.

While in Florida, a talent scout spotted the Olates and brought them to California. They worked in commercials and films, and performed for celebrities. Using mostly rescue dogs, the Olates continued to build up their act. To train his dogs, Richard uses imitative play and a lot of patience. He demonstrates the trick and then puts the dog into proper position over and over again. Eventually, the dog starts to try to emulate what Richard is doing. The Olates use physical and verbal cues to let the dogs know which trick to do. The family adopted an extra dog solely as a pet so that the performance dogs were not too distracted from casual play.

In 2001, the Olate act, then called the Olate Family's Dogs appeared in the Big Apple Circus. They did a variety of tricks including walking on two legs, going down slides, pushing scooters, and jumping over hurdles. The New York Times called the act a crowd pleaser. In 2007, the Olate dog act was featured in the Ringling Bros. and Barnum & Bailey Circus, performing tricks such as jumping rope, riding a scooter, and doing a conga line. They have appeared on The Today Show and Live! With Regis and Kelly, winning a "Relly" award for favorite specialty performance on the latter.

By 2012, Jose had left the act. Olate Dogs, based in Houston, Texas, have four distinct acts featuring a variety of tricks. The acts are about 5 minutes long and feature up to 10 dogs at a time. In total they have 22 dogs – 10 active and 12 either in training or retired. According to the Olates, the hardest trick is the back flip.

== America's Got Talent ==
When the Olates were traveling in Orlando in 2012, they heard that America's Got Talent (AGT) was in town for auditions. Friends urged them to try out, but Richard Olate, then aged 55, thought it would just be a hassle and go nowhere. Nicholas, then 19, convinced his father to audition. The auditioning was difficult – the Olates had to carry the dogs everywhere – but was worth it when they got a standing ovation. Their dog act impressed the judges enough to be put them straight through into the top 48, bypassing Vegas week.

Appearing in what was described as the "toughest quarterfinal" of AGT, Olate dogs finished in the top three of the public vote and moved on to the semifinals. In the semifinals, the act featured a dog riding a scooter, an all dog conga line, and the return of their back flipping poodle. A new dog, Bella, made her debut on the show doing a tumbling act with both trainers. The public vote placed Olate Dogs in the top two, sending them to the finals.

In the finale of America's Got Talent, Olate Dogs began with a dog "driving" a car onstage. Other tricks included dogs walking on just their hind legs, jumping tricks, and back flips. With one of the dogs in her lap, judge Sharon Osbourne said she was watching "pure love on that stage" and said the act made her "so happy." In her recap, Amy Reiter of the Los Angeles Times called Olate Dogs "the most talented puppies on the planet."

In the public vote, Olate Dogs finished first, beating out comedian Tom Cotter and musician William Close to claim the US$1,000,000 first prize.

== After America's Got Talent ==
Olate Dogs headlined the America's Got Talent Live in Las Vegas stage show at The Palazzo Theatre in the fall of 2012 and again in early 2013. The 90-minute show featured a return of fan-favorite routines from AGT plus new routines and never before seen dogs. They appeared on the Tonight Show with Jay Leno on November 2. On the show, they did several jumping tricks, had three dogs ride a scooter, and performed a three dog conga line. One dog jumped rope on its hind legs and another did back flips. They concluded with the trainers doing a tumbling act with one of the dogs.

From February through April 2013, Olate Dogs appeared in The America's Got Talent Live - All Star Tour, a cross-country tour featuring top acts from seasons six and seven. Subsequently, they performed during halftime of several NBA games. During the summer, they toured various county fairs. The son of Jose Olate, Juan, joined the act. Nicholas Olate is recording a music album "Think Big" to be released from Domo Records on October 8, 2013.

On September 11, 2013, Olate Dogs returned to "America's Got Talent" as a guest performer during the Top 12 results show.

They released their holiday album "The Olate Dogs' Christmas" from Domo Records on October 29, 2013.

In 2014 Olate Dogs made their movie debut by starring in "Le Sauvetage (The Rescue)", a short film that premiered at the Sonoma International Film Festival, and selected for the Festival de Cannes Court Métrage. The film is a part of the #RescueFilm series, presented by Halo, Purely for Pets and created by Peter McEvilley to celebrate rescue pets and promote pet adoption. The series also include “Dog’s Best Friend” and “A Holiday Tail”.

On Thanksgiving night of the same year, Olate Dogs performed on the TV special Fox’s Cause for Paws: An All-Star Dog Spectacular, which was co-hosted by Jane Lynch and Hilary Swank. During the program, celebrities such as Miranda Lambert, P!nk, Sharon Osbourne, Paula Abdul, and Betty White introduced adoptable dogs to viewers, providing them the opportunity to provide a new home.

In December, Olate Dogs launched the ‘Holiday Rescue Tour’ and toured Northern California as they combined the dog’s tricks with Nicholas’ live music performance and comedy acts. They performed in Fresno, Salinas, Livermore, Sonoma, Healdsburg and Vacaville. To this day, the Olate Dogs continue to tour and perform at various venues throughout the country, including states such as Florida, Texas, Arizona, Virginia, Ohio, Michigan, California, and New York.

Preceded by Landau Eugene Murphy Jr.	America's Got Talent winner Season 7 (Summer 2012)	Succeeded by Kenichi Ebina
