= Smage Brothers Riding Shows =

Motorcycle stunt performers

The Smage Brothers Riding Show consists of two brothers, Pat and Phil Smage. Both are from Elkhorn, Wisconsin. Their bike show competed on the sixth season of America's Got Talent, which airs on NBC. They were eliminated in the Top 10 round on September 6–7, 2011 episode.

== Background ==
=== Phil Smage ===
Phil Smage is a professional action sports athlete. As a snowskater for Ambition Snowskates, Smage has had 3 X games victories, along with 3 Guinness World Records for snowskating. He was a national professional #10 for the AMA Maxxis Endurocross series, and also the national champion for the MM12A class at the Maxxis Mini Moto SX in 2007. Having finished in the top ten in the AMA/NATC Trials championship series, Smage takes his trials skills nationwide with his brother in their motorcycle trials shows.

Starting in July 2014, Phil is playing Captain America in the Marvel Universe Live tour for two years. His part involves him doing motorcycle tricks, acting, and doing staged fights.

=== Pat Smage ===
Pat Smage is an eight-time AMA/NATC Trials PRO National Champion. In 2003 Patrick won the AMA Youth National title. In 2004 Patrick won the AMA/NATC Expert/Sportman Class. In 2007, he was named AMA Sports Athlete of the Year, the youngest rider to ever receive that title. Smage is the first American in over 30 years to compete in the overseas FIM World Championships, with wins in Italy, Portugal and the U.S.A.

== Shows ==
The shows consists of the duo doing trick riding, stunts, and jumping between obstacles. They also do wheelies and compete for who can do the most wheel hops. They time how long that they can ride a motorized unicycle; they hold the world record at 3 1/2 minutes.

The Smage brothers have traveled around the United States, including the International Motorcycle Shows expo at Long Beach, California.

== America's Got Talent ==
The Smage Brothers Riding Show entered as an act in 2011 on America's Got Talent. They have advanced through to the semifinal stage of competition. The act made it through the semifinals when Sharon Osbourne and Howie Mandel voted them through to the finals.

- Audition Advanced
- Las Vegas week Advanced
- Quarter-finals Bottom 2
- Semi-finals Bottom 2
- Top 10 Eliminated
