= Rishi Budhrani =

Singaporean stand-up comedian

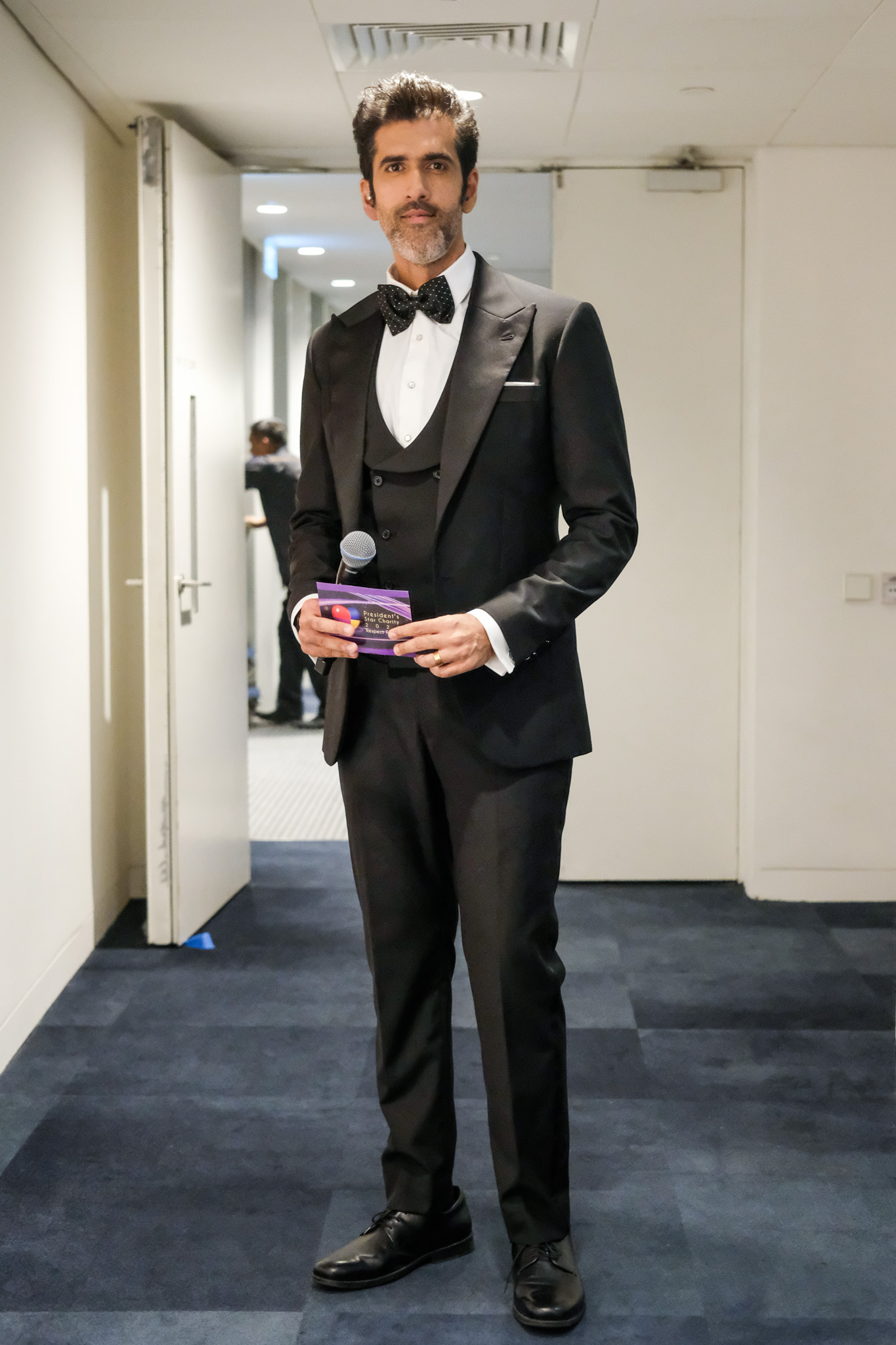
- Budhrani in 2023
- Born: Rishi Budhrani; 9 June 1984 (age 42); Singapore
- Education: Nanyang Technological University
- Spouse: Sharul Channa (m. 2015)

Comedy career
- Years active: 2009–present
- Medium: Stand-up; Television; Film; Radio; Host
- Genres: political satire; news satire; black comedy; observational comedy; improvisational comedy
- Subjects: Politics; Culture of Asia; India; Race Relations; Identity; Relationships; Family; Current Events; Pop culture
- Website: http://rishibudhrani.com

Rishi Budhrani (born 9 June 1984) is a Singaporean comedian, actor, and host.

He began performing in 2011 and became the first Singaporean to perform at the Gotham Comedy Club in New York City. He is also the first stand-up comedian to host Singapore's National Day Parade in 2022. as well as the President's Star Charity in October 2023. Rishi has been featured on Comedy Central and CNA, and has headlined shows in Sydney, Dubai, India, China, Sri Lanka, and Melbourne, Australia.

Rishi was a writer and regular panelist on OK CHOPE, Singapore's first-ever comedy panel show to be broadcast on live TV. He has been featured in comedy productions like Dream Academy's Happy Ever Laughter, The Noose, and Kaki's stage show, as well as several award-winning series including Downstairs on Netflix and Unexpected Journeys by Singapore Airlines and Singapore Tourism Board.

Rishi was named an Singapore Tourism Board (STB) ambassador in 2018, and was featured in numerous advertising campaigns and efforts. These include his work in Unexpected Journeys, a 3-part travel series that went on to win The Los Angeles Film Award (LAFA) 2019 for Best Picture & Best TV Series and the New York Movie Awards 2019 for Best Web/TV Series

Rishi has won multiple awards for his work as a comic and actor including the Hong Kong International Comedy Competition 2012, Asian Academy Creative Awards 2021, Asia Contents Awards 2021, and the Content Asia Awards 2021.

== Early life ==
Rishi was born in Singapore on 9 June 1984 to Indian Singaporean parents of Sindhi Hindu descent, Parkash "Jimmy" Budhrani and his wife, who moved to Singapore from Mumbai and Jaipur, both in India during the 1960s and the 1970s respectively, right after Singapore's independence.

Rishi grew up in the Bedok South neighborhood in Singapore and studied in Bedok View Primary School, Tanjong Katong Secondary School, and Tampines Junior College. He went on to do a Bachelors in Communications Studies at the Nanyang Technological University (NTU) and a Minor in Drama and Performance from the National Institute of Education (NIE). He was offered a Scholarship to train under The Young Company, Singapore Repertory Theatre's training program for 16- to 25-year-olds while studying at NTU.

== Career ==
=== Comedian ===
Rishi began performing as a stand-up comedian in Singapore in 2009. He participated in and won the HK International Comedy Festival in 2012, becoming the first Singaporean to do so.

After winning the Hong Kong International Comedy Competition 2012, Rishi used the prize money to fly to New York City in 2013 and performed at the Comic Strip Live and the Gotham Comedy Club. He also had a spot at the Acme Comedy Club in Minnesota. He then went on to headline shows at the Sydney Comedy Festival and the Melbourne International Comedy Festival in the same year

Rishi's marriage to Sharul Channa, Singapore's first full-time female comedian, inspired The Rishi and Sharul Show in 2015 and the show played to full-house audiences at the Goodman Arts Centre Black Box. In 2020, the comedic couple returned to the stage for The Rishi and Sharul Show 2 at the Capitol Theatre.

During the pandemic lockdowns in Singapore, Rishi also created and hosted The Rishi Report, a live news parody show based on the local news and political scene. Rishi did special Rishi Report episodes on the Singapore presidential elections in 2023.

Rishi toured the USA for a month in August 2023 and performed stand-up comedy at the famous ‘Gotham Comedy Club’ among other venues in New York, Las Vegas, and Los Angeles. He returned to Singapore to perform Artificial Indian, his biggest ever solo show at the Drama Centre Theatre in September.

=== Host ===
Rishi hosted Unexpected Journeys a three-part series that was a collaboration between Singapore Airlines and Singapore Tourism Board. The series went on to win The Los Angeles Film Award (LAFA) – Best Picture & Best TV Series DEC 2019 and the New York Movie Awards (Best Web/TV Series NOV 2019).

He went on to host S.P.I.E.S., the Singapore Tourism Board's web series in 2020 and "Just Don’t Tell Mum", a 5-part CNA series in 2021. Rishi also hosted "What’s The Big Deal", another 5-part CNA series in 2022.

In 2022, Rishi became the first comedian in Singapore to host the Singapore National Day Parade which saw a crowd of 25,000. He went on to host the 2023 President's Star Charity, MediaCorp's annual flagship fundraiser that supports a wide range of beneficiaries under the President's Challenge and aims to rally the public in raising funds for vulnerable groups in Singapore.

=== Actor ===
Rishi started working in theatre when he received an acting scholarship with the Singapore Repertory Theatre's Young Company. Since then, he has been cast in several local productions such as Wild Rice's Cook A Pot of Curry where the production house had been nominated for Best Ensemble in the Straits Times Life! Theatre Awards. Additionally, Rishi starred in #LookatMe, Hum Theater's We Are Like This Only!, and also played the character of Mr. Boo in Pandemonium's The Rise and Fall of Little Voice.

Expanding into voice acting, Rishi has also played prominent roles in Singapore-based animated productions where he voiced Roti Paranda Seller, Sammy, on the award-winning Netflix series, Downstairs, and the series ‘Zoom into History’, launched by the National Museum of Singapore.

=== Notable performances ===
==== Comedians Star Charity (2021) ====
In the spirit of Singapore's National Day, the Comedians' Star Charity is themed around giving support to communities in Singapore. Rishi hosted this late-night comedy talk show that featured other local celebrities including Yung Raja, ALYPH, Ra Ra Kumar, Gurmit Singh and Benjamin Kheng.

==== Rishi Budhrani, Live and Exposed (2022) ====
Rishi performed his comedy special, "EXPOSED" in 2022 at the Singapore Repertory Theatre. During the live show, Rishi shared his story of becoming the first stand-up comedian to headline Singapore's National Day Parade in front of 25,000 people. He also performed his signature blend of observational comedy combined with personal stories that resonated with local audiences.

==== "Can I Make You A Suit, Mate?" (2022) ====
Rishi created and performed "Can I Make You A Suit, Mate?" at the Esplanade Theatres, a semi-improvised comic monologue inspired by his father's own life journey. The performance has been regarded as an original, poignant, and humorous tale based on Rishi's father, who had a tremendous impact on his life and career.

==== Singapore National Day Parade (2022) ====
Rishi became the first stand-up comedian in Singapore to host the National Day Parade (NDP) in 2022. The show was held at the Marina Bay floating platform with 25,000 people in attendance. Rishi was joined by actress Siti Khalijah and radio personalities Joakim Gomez and Sonia Chew as co-hosts. He was invited to host the parade by Adrian Pang, the creative director of the NDP show segment.

Several viral moments occurred during that year's National Day Parade, including a spectator interviewed by Rishi who excitedly expressed gratitude for obtaining a BTO (Build-To-Order) queue number from the Housing and Development Board (HDB) in the midst of rising public housing costs in Singapore.

===== Artificial Indian (2023) =====
In September 2023, Rishi debuted his solo stand-up comedy performance "AI – Artificial Indian" to sold-out audiences at the Drama Centre Theatre. The title of the Programme is a wordplay of Artificial Intelligence (AI), since the comic often noticed news about the technology swarming his feeds.

The show was reviewed as having Rishi's "signature blend of commentary on politics and current affairs (in Singapore)", albeit with a light and comedic touch. He discussed current racial microaggressions against Singaporean minorities while providing a platform for opening acts to showcase their comic skills and express their perspectives on being from minority groups in Singapore.

==== President Star Charity (2023) ====
In October 2023, Rishi co-hosted Mediacorp's annual flagship event, the President's Star Charity (PSC), alongside Singaporean journalist and broadcaster, Diana Ser. The fundraiser, with the theme 'Respect for all,' garnered over S$11 million in donations and featured local and international artiste performances. Newly-elected President Tharman Shanmugaratnam and his wife, Jane Ittogi, served as guests of honour for the event.

== Personal life ==
Rishi has a close relationship with his father, Parkash "Jimmy" Budhrani, who was also the subject of inspiration for his 2022 comedy special, "Can I Make You A Suit, Mate?". The mention of suits is based on his father's real-life work as a tailor boutique owner in Singapore. Rishi routinely appears in comedy shows and hosting gigs wearing tailored suits from his father's boutique.

Rishi is married to Sharul Channa, a prominent female stand up comedian in Singapore, in 2015. The pair met in 2007 as students when they were members of Tez Dhaar (Razor's Edge), a dance group in Singapore that performed at Indian weddings and events. They started dating shortly after and got married eight years later. Their marriage inspired the first edition of The Rishi and Sharul Show in Singapore that sold out in 2015. In 2019, the pair collaborated on a CNA show ‘Rishi & Sharul Try’ where they experimented with different subcultures. In 2020, five years after the first show, they presented a second edition of The Rishi and Sharul Show.

=== Health and fitness ===
During the COVID-19 pandemic, Rishi indulged in unhealthy food and alcohol as means to cope with the loss of a close friend. Adding work burnout to the mix, he eventually weighed his heaviest at over 90 kilograms in 2021. Seeing how his declining health negatively affected his everyday life, Rishi underwent a physical and mental transformation by dedicating himself to a rigorous fitness regimen with a renewed focus on health.

=== Philanthropy ===
Since 2017, Rishi has hosted events launched by Singapore-based advocacy organizations such as the Association of Women for Action and Research (AWARE). Besides hosting, he also contributed comedy sets for various charities and fundraising events including the Comedians' Star Charity and the Wild Rice Ball.

== Brand endorsements ==
With his growing presence in the local entertainment scene in Singapore, Rishi has been part of several brand campaigns, where he contributed acting, modelling, moderating and comedy acts. Several campaigns reflected his personal advocacy of health, animal welfare, and elevating youth voices in Singapore.

Year	Brand Campaigns / Events	Role	Ref.
2023	Post-Budget 2023 Youth Dialogue	Guest Moderator	
2022	Citibank Singapore Launch of Citi Plus	Guest Performer	
2021	Society for the Prevention of Cruelty to Animals (SPCA): Paws for a Cause	SPCA Youth Ambassador	
2021	Harley-Davidson Asia's first-ever virtual owners group rally	Guest Attendee	
2021	Gillette Skin Care Launch	Ad Model	
2021	National Youth Council's (NYC) Virtual Ministerial Engagement Session	Guest Moderator	
2020	Titoudao's Tasha Low Live-Stream Cooking Show	Guest Participant	
2020	Zomato@home Weekend Festival	Guest Comedian	
2019	A Night at the Art Gallery	Guest Comedian	
2017	Uber's driver recruitment campaign	Guest Actor	
2017	Singapore Writers Festival	Guest Debater	
2015	#ThatWeekend Feeling Campaign Launch	Guest Comedian	
2014	Havas Worldwide Singapore & Red Cross Blood Donation Drive	Ad Model & Guest Participant	

== Filmography ==
=== Comedy Shows and Specials ===
Year(s)	Title	Ref.
2014–2023	Happy Ever Laughter	
2022	"Can I Make You A Suit, Mate?"	
2022	East Coast Comedy Standup Night Related News	
2021	Black Friday The Show	
2021	Dream Comedy Cruise	
2021	Double Vaxxed	
2021	Flip Sides: A PowerPoint Karaoke Show	
2021	"The Rishi Report" related news	
2020	Laugh with Discover	
2015–2020	The Rishi and Sharul Show	
2017–2018	Cannot Means Cannot by Rishi Budhrani	
2016–2017	Noose & Kakis	
2016	Weirdass Pajama Festival, India	
2015	Kings and Queens of Comedy Asia 6	
2015	Comedy Cebu Production	
2015–2017	Comedy Fringe Festival	
2014	BeerFest Asia	

=== Film and television ===
Year	Title	Role	Ref.
2023	Nirjhari (short film)	Director	
2022	Kalaa Utsavam – Indian Festival of the Arts at The Esplanade	Comedian	
2022	Unravel the Conspiracy at the Heart of Chinatown Detective Agency	Voice Actor	
2022	CNN's Richard Quest returns to Singapore on Quest's World of Wonder	Guest Interviewee	
2020	Straight Up: The Coronalogues by Singapore Repertory Theatre	Actor, Comedian	
2020	Zoom into History	Voice Actor	
2020	Majulah Live	Comedian	
2020	‘Humour Me’ by Circles.Life	Comedian	
2019	MACC – The Goodbye Tour	Voice Actor, Comedian	
2019	The Projector presents Comedy Night	Comedian	
2019	Dastak – Hindi Theatre Festival (fourth edition)	Director	
2017	Ardh Satya (Dastak 2017)	Director	
2017	Comedy Central Asia (season 2)	Comedian	
2016	Stand-Up, Asia!	Comedian	
2013	HuM Theatre – We Are Like This Only	Actor	
2013	Cook a Pot of Curry- Documentary	Actor	

=== Hosting ===
Year	Title	Role	Ref.
2022–2023	What's The Big Deal (season 1)	Host	
2022	National Day Parade	Co-host	
2016	The Royal Deepavali Ball	Host, comedian	

== Awards and nominations ==
Award	Year	Category	Nominated work(s)	Results	Ref.
Asia Contents Award	2021	Best Asian Animation	style="background: #FFE3E3; color: black; vertical-align: middle; text-align: center; " class="no table-no2 notheme"|Nominated		
ContentAsia Awards	2021	Best Asian Comedy Programme	style="background: #FFE3E3; color: black; vertical-align: middle; text-align: center; " class="no table-no2 notheme"|Nominated		
ContentAsia Awards	2023	Best Short-form Drama Series Made in Asia	style="background: #FFE3E3; color: black; vertical-align: middle; text-align: center; " class="no table-no2 notheme"|Nominated		
The Los Angeles Film Awards	2019	Best Picture & Best TV Series	Unexpected Journeys	Won	
New York Movie Awards	2019	Best Web/TV Series	style="background: #9EFF9E; color: #000; vertical-align: middle; text-align: center; " class="yes table-yes2 notheme"|Won		
New York Festivals TV and Films Awards	2023	Streaming Comedy	style="background: #FFE3E3; color: black; vertical-align: middle; text-align: center; " class="no table-no2 notheme"|Nominated		
