= America's Got Talent season 7 =

America's Got Talent
- Season 7
- Showrunner: Jason Raff
- Hosted by: Nick Cannon
- Judges: Howard Stern; Sharon Osbourne; Howie Mandel
- Winner: Olate Dogs
- Runner-up: Tom Cotter
- Finals venue: New Jersey Performing Arts Center
- No. of episodes: 31

Release
- Original network: NBC
- Original release: May 14 – September 13, 2012

Season chronology
- ← Previous; Season 6 Next → Season 8

Judges and Host for America's Got Talent Season 7

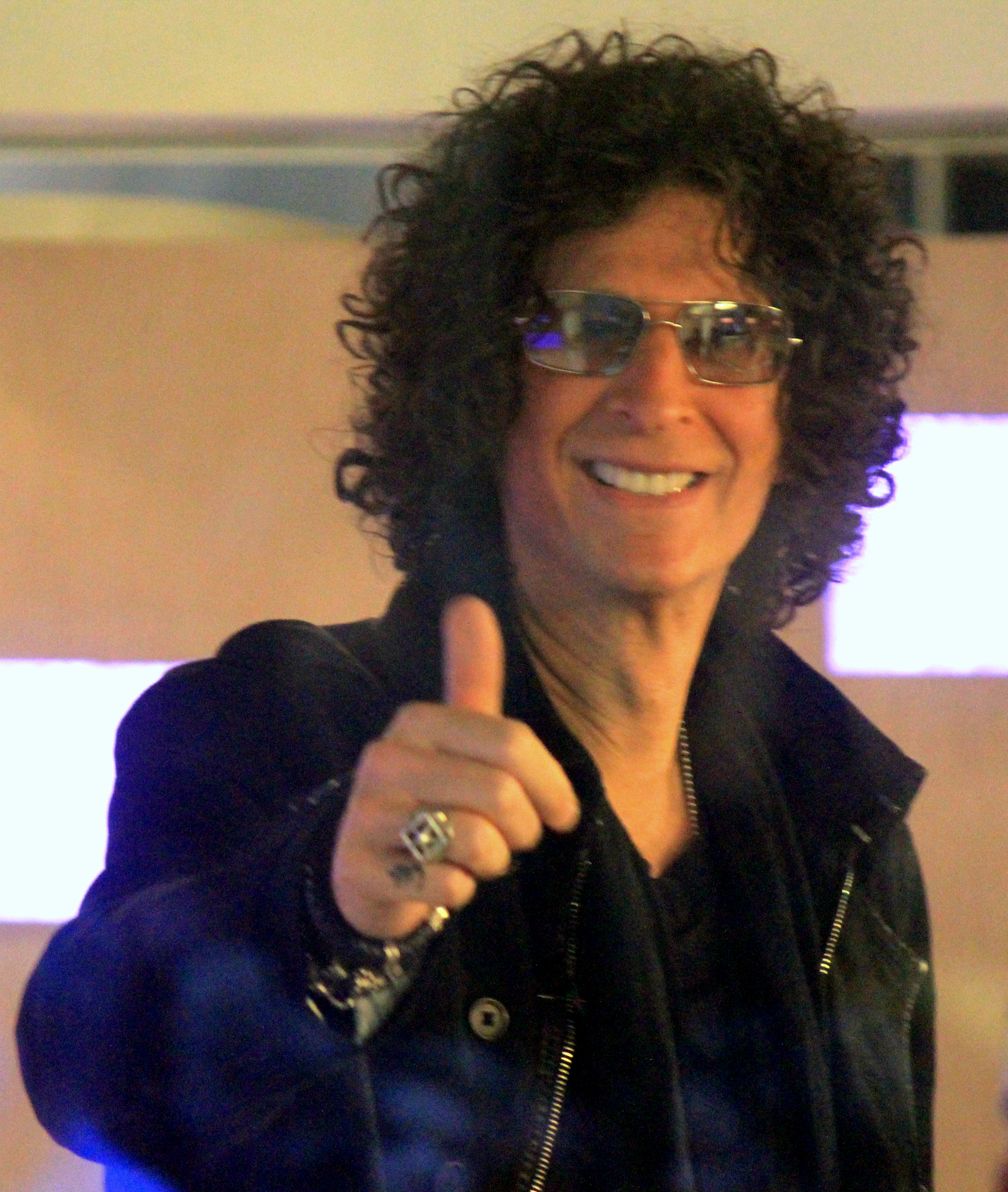
Howard Stern

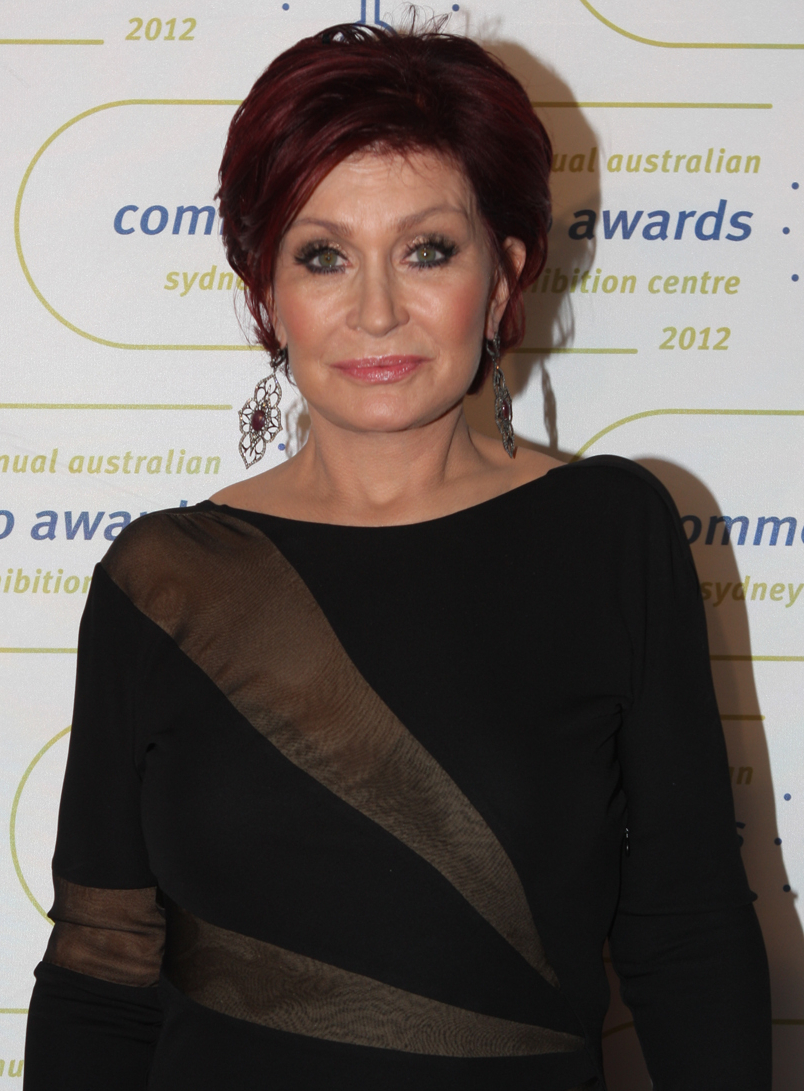
Sharon Osbourne

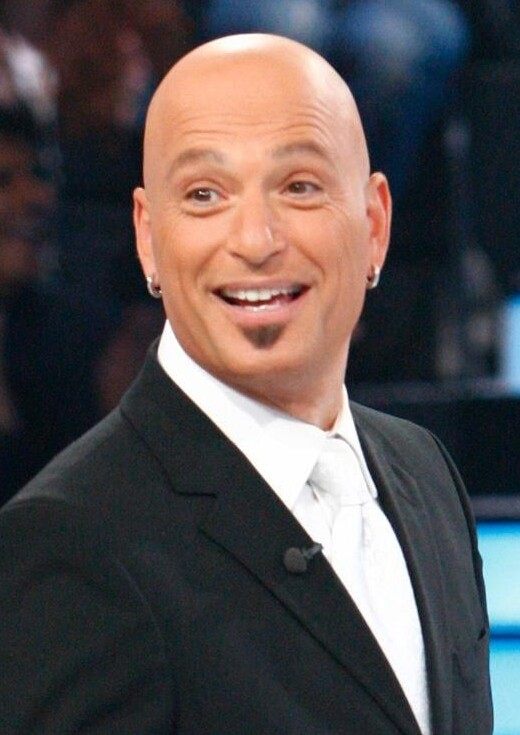
Howie Mandel

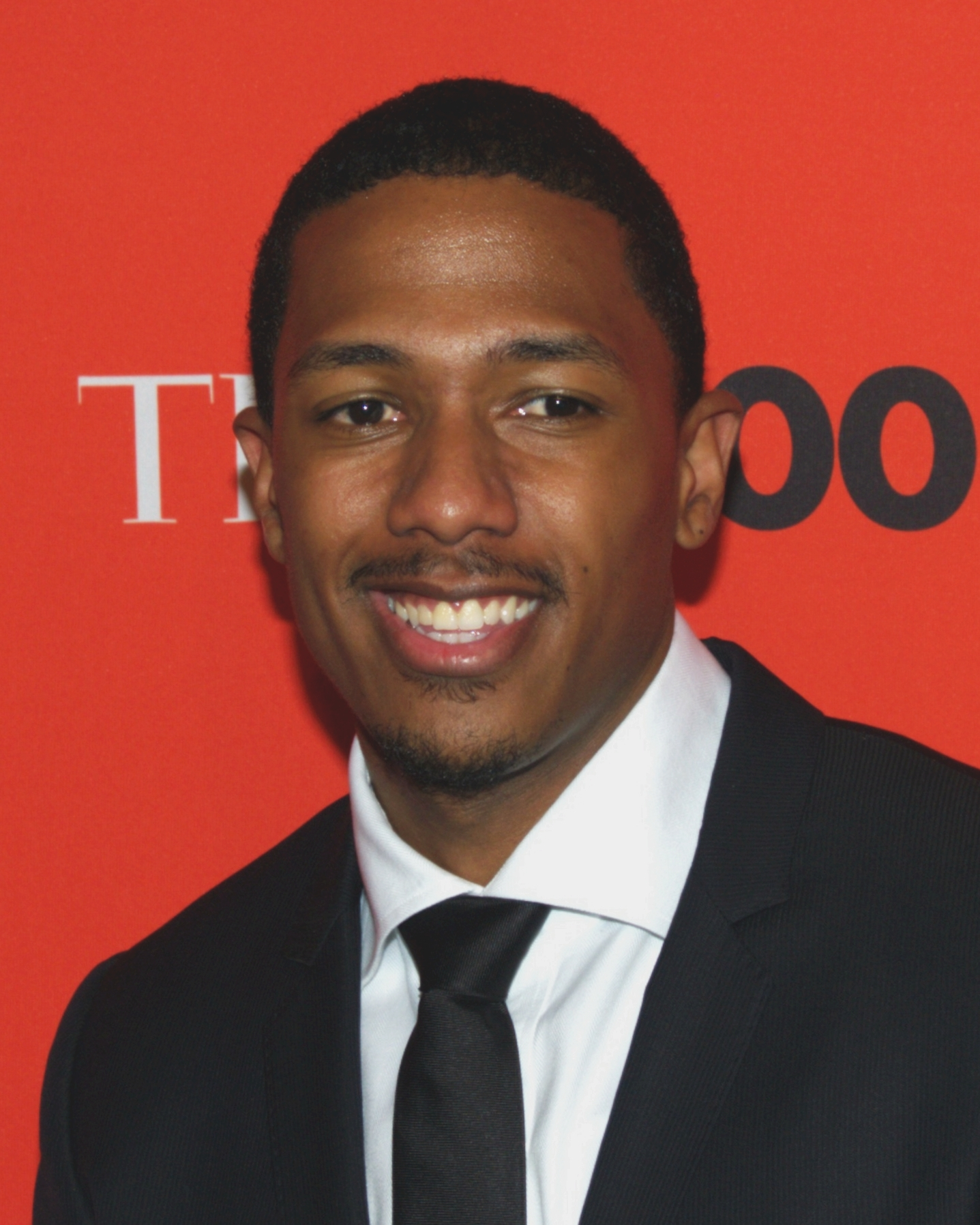
Nick Cannon

The seventh season of American talent show competition series America's Got Talent was broadcast on NBC from May 14 to September 13, 2012. After the previous season, Piers Morgan left the program due to other commitments; he was replaced by the producers with Howard Stern. However, this change involved moving the venue for the live rounds of the competition from Los Angeles to Newark, New Jersey, which increased the size of the audience that attended each live episode. Along with a visual makeover of the program to improve its presentation on television, a planned break was included with the broadcast schedule between July 24 and August 14, to avoid clashing with the network's live coverage of the 2012 Summer Olympics in London.

The seventh season was won by dog tricks act Olate Dogs, with stand-up comedian Tom Cotter finishing in second, and earth harpist William Close placing third. During its broadcast, the season averaged around over 10.05 million viewers.

== Season overview ==
Auditions for the seventh season's competition took place during Winter until mid-Spring 2012, with the main auditions being filmed in New York, Los Angeles, Tampa Bay, Austin, St. Louis and San Francisco. Additional auditions were held in Washington, D.C., and Charlotte, but were not filmed.

After the conclusion of the sixth season's broadcast, Piers Morgan began contemplating his involvement with America's Got Talent, due to his increasing work schedule on other projects by that time. In November 2011, despite having signed a three-year contract the previous year, Morgan quit the show in order to focus on his commitment to producing Piers Morgan Tonight for CNN. Due to Morgan's departure, radio personality Howard Stern was chosen to replace him in December. Since Stern had commitments to his SiriusXM radio show in New York that he could not abandon, filming of the live rounds moved from Los Angeles, opting for using the New Jersey Performing Arts Center in Newark, New Jersey. However, Stern was able to handle the involvement of the "Vegas Verdicts" segment without any issue.

While the use of the Performing Arts Center meant that audiences attending live rounds could be much larger than in previous years, the change in venue also allowed executive producer Simon Cowell to have the program undergo a significant "top-to-bottom makeover" of its presentation. Among these included new graphics, a new intro and a new theme song for America's Got Talent, along with an update to set pieces. A significant change was the appearance of the judges' desk, which was re-modeled to appear similar in design to that used on Britain's Got Talent. In addition to these changes, the 2012 Summer Olympics was taken into consideration, since the sporting event would receive live coverage from the network. Episode scheduling had to include a two-week hiatus between July 27 until August 12, as to avoid America's Got Talent clashing with its live broadcast.

Of the participants who auditioned for this season, sixty-two secured a place in the six live quarter-finals, with twelve in each round. The sixth quarter-final consisted of two participants selected from those that failed to reach the live rounds, along with ten quarter-finalists that had been eliminated in their respective rounds. About twenty-three quarter-finalists advanced and were split between the two semi-finals, with an additional semi-finalist being added in at the last minute. Six semi-finalists secured a place in the finals, which consisted of a single stage and not multiple rounds as in previous seasons. The following below lists the results of each participant's overall performance in this season:

Winner | Runner-up | Third place | Finalist | Semi-finalist
Quarter-finalist | Wildcard Quarter-finalist

Participant	Age(s) ^{1}	Genre	Act	From	Quarter-Final	Result
7 in Unison	14-15	Dance	Dance Group	Yorba Linda, California	5	Eliminated
787 Crew	19-31	Dance	Dance Group	San Juan, Puerto Rico	1	Eliminated
Academy of Villains	—N/a	Dance	Dance Group	San Francisco	5	Semi-finalist
All Beef Patty	38	Singing	Drag Singer	Brooklyn, New York	3	Eliminated
All That!	23-36	Dance	Clogging Group	Myrtle Beach, South Carolina	4 ^{2}	Semi-finalist
All Wheel Sports	18-35	Acrobatics / Danger	BMX Stunt Team	Los Angeles	3	Semi-finalist
American BMX Stunt Team	20-44	Acrobatics / Danger	BMX Stunt Team	Durham, North Carolina	1	Eliminated
Andrew De Leon	19	Singing	Opera Singer	Kyle, Texas	6	Semi-finalist
Aurora Light Painters	38-46	Variety	Light Painting Group	San Francisco	2	Eliminated
Bandbaz Brothers	34 & 59	Acrobatics	Acrobatic Duo	Las Vegas	6	Eliminated
Ben Blaque	33	Danger	Crossbow Shooter	Branson, Missouri	2 ^{2}	Eliminated
Big Barry	70	Singing	Singer	Fort Lauderdale, Florida	2	Eliminated
Bria Kelly	16	Singing	Singer	Virginia Beach, Virginia	5	Semi-finalist
Cast in Bronze	61	Music	Carillon Musician	St. Peters, Pennsylvania	5	Eliminated
Clint Carvalho & His Extreme Parrots	52	Animal	Parrot Trainer	Las Vegas	5	Semi-finalist
Cristin Sandu	18	Danger	Balancing Acrobat	Las Vegas	3 ^{2}	Eliminated
Danielle Stallings	14	Singing	Singer	Richmond, Virginia	2	Eliminated
David "The Bullet" Smith	34	Danger	Human Cannonball	Englewood, Florida	4	Eliminated
David Garibaldi and His CMYK's	26-30	Variety	Painting Group	Sacramento, California	1	Finalist
Distinguished Men of Brass	24-60	Music	Brass Band	Tampa, Florida	1	Eliminated
Donovan & Rebecca	44 & 36	Acrobatics	Acrobatic Duo	Stony Brook, New York	2	Semi-finalist
Drew Erwin	16	Singing / Music	Singer & Guitarist	Arlington, Tennessee	5	Eliminated
Edon	14	Singing / Music	Singer & Pianist	Chicago	1	Semi-finalist
Elusive	21	Dance	Dancer	Austin, Texas	3	Eliminated
Eric & Olivia	20	Singing / Music	Band	Austin, Texas	4	Eliminated
Eric Buss	37	Variety	Novelty Act	Tucson, Arizona	5	Eliminated
Eric Dittelman	26	Magic	Mentalist	Boston	4	Semi-finalist
Hawley Magic	30	Magic	Magic Duo	Shelby, North Carolina	2	Eliminated
Horse	25	Variety	Nutshot Taker	Harrisburg, Pennsylvania	4 ^{2}	Eliminated
Inspire the Fire	13–29	Singing / Dance	Choir & Dance Group	Charlotte, North Carolina	3	Eliminated
Jacob Williams	23	Comedy	Comedian	Chicago	3	Semi-finalist
Jake Wesley Rogers	15	Singing / Music	Singer & Pianist	Ozark, Missouri	3 ^{2}	Eliminated
Jarrett & Raja	39 & 32	Comedy / Magic	Magic Duo	Las Vegas	1 ^{2}	Eliminated
Joe Castillo	64	Variety	Sand Artist	Lexington, Kentucky	4	Finalist
Lightwire Theater	25-43	Dance	Light-Up Dance Group	New Orleans	3	Semi-finalist
Lil' Starr	6	Dance	Tap Dancer	Chino, California	1	Eliminated
Lindsey Norton	17	Dance	Dancer	Tampa	4 ^{2}	Eliminated
LionDanceMe	14-35	Dance	Lion Dance Group	San Francisco	2	Eliminated
Lisa Clark Dancers	14-18	Dance	Dance Group	Suisun City, California	2	Eliminated
Melinda Hill	39	Comedy	Comedian	Los Angeles	5	Eliminated
Michael Nejad	55	Music	Household Musician	San Jose, California	1	Eliminated
Nikki Jensen	25	Singing / Music	Singer & Guitarist	Austin, Texas	1	Eliminated
Olate Dogs	19 & 55	Animal	Dog Act	New York City	4	Winner
Reverse Order	—N/a	Singing / Music	Band	Hackettstown, New Jersey	5	Eliminated
Rock Star Juggler Mike Price	33	Variety	Juggler	Las Vegas	3	Eliminated
Romeo Dance Cheetah	30	Music	Air Guitarist	Chicago	5	Eliminated
Rudy Coby	48	Magic	Magician	Los Angeles	5	Eliminated
Sebastien "El Charro de Oro"	10	Singing	Mariachi Singer	San Antonio, Texas	4 ^{2}	Semi-finalist
Shanice & Maurice Hayes	18 & 62	Singing	Singing Duo	Kansas City, Missouri	1	Semi-finalist
Spencer Horsman	26	Danger	Escape Artist	Baltimore, Maryland	3 ^{2}	Eliminated
The All Ways	19-22	Singing / Music	Band	New York City	2	Eliminated
The Magic of Puck	46	Magic	Magician	Roosevelt, New York	5	Semi-finalist
The Scott Brothers	47 & 48	Dance	Dance Duo	Las Vegas	1	Semi-finalist
The Untouchables	8-13	Dance	Dance Group	Miami	3	Finalist
Tim Hockenberry	50	Singing / Music	Singer & Pianist	San Francisco	2	Semi-finalist
Todd Oliver	53	Comedy / Animals	Ventriloquist	Branson, Missouri	1 ^{2}	Semi-finalist
Tom Cotter	48	Comedy	Comedian	Stony Point, New York	2	Runner-up
Turf	21	Acrobatics / Dance	Contortionist Dancer	San Francisco	2	Semi-finalist
Ulysses	49	Singing	Singer	Statesville, North Carolina	4	Eliminated
Unity in Motion	11-16	Dance	Dance Group	Cape May, New Jersey	4	Eliminated
William Close	42	Music	Earth Harpist	Los Angeles	4	Third place
Wordspit and the Illest!	20-27	Singing / Music	Band	New York City	3	Eliminated

- ^1 Ages denoted for a participant(s), pertain to their final performance for this season.
- ^2 These participants were entered into the Wildcard quarter-final after losing their initial quarter-final.

=== Quarter-finals summary ===
Buzzed Out | Judges' choice | Advanced to Semi-finals
Won Judges' Vote | Lost Judges' Vote

==== Quarter-final 1 (July 2) ====
Guest Performers, Results Show: Cast of Cirque du Soleil: Zarkana, and will.i.am

Quarter-Finalist	Order	Buzzes and Judges' votes			Result (July 3)
Quarter-Finalist	Order	Mandel	Osbourne	Stern	Result (July 3)
Distinguished Men of Brass	1				Eliminated
Edon	2				Won Judges' Vote
Jarrett and Raja	3				Eliminated
Lil' Starr	4				Eliminated
Todd Oliver	5				Lost Judges' Vote
American BMX Stunt Team	6				Eliminated
Nikki Jensen	7				Eliminated
The Scott Brothers	8				Advanced
Michael Nejad	9				Eliminated
787 Crew	10				Eliminated
Shanice & Maurice Hayes	11				Advanced
David Garibaldi and His CMYK's	12				Advanced

==== Quarter-final 2 (July 10) ====
Guest Performers, Results Show: Gavin DeGraw, and TRACES

Quarter-Finalist	Order	Buzzes and Judges' votes			Result (July 11)
Quarter-Finalist	Order	Mandel	Osbourne	Stern	Result (July 11)
LionDanceMe	1				Eliminated
Turf	2				Advanced
The All Ways	3				Eliminated
Hawley Magic	4				Eliminated
Lisa Clark Dancers	5				Eliminated
Aurora Light Painters	6				Eliminated
Danielle Stallings	7				Lost Judges' Vote
Donovan & Rebecca	8				Won Judges' Vote
Big Barry	9				Eliminated
Tom Cotter	10				Advanced
Ben Blaque	11				Eliminated
Tim Hockenberry	12				Advanced

==== Quarter-final 3 (July 17) ====
Guest Performers, Results Show: Ashleigh and Pudsey, and Havana Brown

Quarter-Finalist	Order	Buzzes and Judges' votes			Result (July 18)
Quarter-Finalist	Order	Mandel	Osbourne	Stern	Result (July 18)
The Untouchables	1				Advanced
Rock Star Juggler Mike Price	2				Eliminated
Inspire the Fire	3				Eliminated
Cristin Sandu	4				Eliminated
Elusive	5				Eliminated
Jake Wesley Rogers	6				Eliminated
All Wheel Sports	7				Won Judges' Vote
WordSpit and the Illest!	8				Lost Judges' Vote
Jacob Williams	9				Advanced
All Beef Patty	10				Eliminated
Spencer Horsman	11				Eliminated
Lightwire Theater	12				Advanced

==== Quarter-final 4 (July 24) ====
Guest Performers, Results Show: Cher Lloyd, and the cast of Once

Quarter-Finalist	Order	Buzzes and Judges' votes			Result (July 25)
Quarter-Finalist	Order	Mandel	Osbourne	Stern	Result (July 25)
David "The Bullet" Smith ^{3}	1				Eliminated
All That!	2				Lost Judges' Vote
Ulysses	3				Eliminated
Joe Castillo	4				Advanced
Sebastien "El Charro de Oro"	5				Eliminated
Eric Dittelman	6				Won Judges' Vote
William Close	7				Advanced
Unity in Motion	8				Eliminated
Eric & Olivia	9				Eliminated
Lindsey Norton	10				Eliminated
Horse	11				Eliminated
Olate Dogs	12				Advanced

- ^3 For health & safety reasons, David Smith had to perform outside the studio; the judges were required to view the performance in person, and used hand-carried signs in place of their buzzers.

==== Quarter-final 5 – YouTube Round (August 14) ====
Guest Performers, Results Show: Gabby Douglas, Karmin, The Crazy Nastyass Honey Badger

Quarter-Finalist	Order	Buzzes and Judges' votes			Result (August 15)
Quarter-Finalist	Order	Mandel	Osbourne	Stern	Result (August 15)
Clint Carvalho and His Extreme Parrots	1				Won Judges' Vote
Reverse Order	2				Eliminated
Rudy Coby	3				Eliminated
7 in Unison	4				Eliminated
Drew Erwin	5				Lost Judges' Vote
Melinda Hill	6				Eliminated
Eric Buss	7				Eliminated
Romeo Dance Cheetah	8				Eliminated
The Magic of Puck	9				Advanced
Bria Kelly	10				Advanced
Cast in Bronze ^{4}	11				Eliminated
Academy of Villains	12				Advanced

- ^4 Due to complications, Cast In Bronze had to perform outside the studio; the judges were required to be in person to view the performance, and used hand-carried signs in place of their buzzers.

==== Quarter-final 6 Wild Card Round (August 21) ====
Guest Performers, Results Show: Owl City & Carly Rae Jepsen, and cast of Bring It On

Quarter-Finalist	Order	Buzzes and Judges' votes			Result (August 22)
Quarter-Finalist	Order	Mandel	Osbourne	Stern	Result (August 22)
Spencer Horsman	1				Eliminated
All That!	2				Won Judges' Vote
Jarrett & Raja	3				Eliminated
Jake Wesley Rogers	4				Eliminated
Cristin Sandu	5				Eliminated
Todd Oliver	6				Advanced
Bandbaz Brothers	7				Eliminated
Sebastien "El Charro de Oro"	8				Advanced
Horse	9				Eliminated
Lindsey Norton	10				Lost Judges' Vote
Andrew De Leon	11				Advanced
Ben Blaque	12				Eliminated

=== Semi-finals summary ===
Buzzed Out | Judges' choice | Advanced to Finals
Won Judges' Vote | Lost Judges' Vote

==== Semi-final 1 (August 28) ====
Guest Performers, Results Show: Neon Trees, and Steve Harvey

Semi-Finalist	Order	Buzzes and Judges' votes			Result (August 29)
Semi-Finalist	Order	Mandel	Osbourne	Stern	Result (August 29)
Andrew De Leon	1				Eliminated
Todd Oliver	2				Lost Judges' Vote
Donovan & Rebecca	3				Eliminated
Edon	4				Eliminated
The Scott Brothers	5				Eliminated
Eric Dittelman	6				Eliminated
Turf	7				Eliminated
Bria Kelly	8				Eliminated
Joe Castillo	9				Won Judges' Vote
William Close	10				Advanced
Tom Cotter	11				Advanced
Academy of Villains	12				Eliminated

==== Semi-final 2 (September 4) ====
Guest Performers, Results Show: Train, Nathan Burton, and Haunted by Heroes with Dee Snider

Semi-Finalist	Order	Buzzes and Judges' votes			Result (September 6) ^{5}
Semi-Finalist	Order	Mandel	Osbourne	Stern	Result (September 6) ^{5}
All That!	1				Eliminated
Sebastien "El Charro de Oro"	2				Eliminated
The Magic of Puck	3				Eliminated
Clint Carvalho and His Extreme Parrots	4				Eliminated
Jacob Williams	5				Eliminated
Shanice and Maurice Hayes	6				Eliminated
All Wheel Sports	7				Eliminated
Tim Hockenberry	8				Eliminated
The Untouchables	9				Advanced
Olate Dogs	10				Advanced
Lightwire Theater	11				Lost Judges' Vote
David Garibaldi and His CMYK's	12				Won Judges' Vote

- ^5 Due to live coverage of the NFL game between the Dallas Cowboys and the New York Giants, the results episode was aired the day after to avoid conflicting with it.

=== Finals (September 12) ===
Guest Performers, Results Show: Justin Bieber, Big Sean, Green Day, Joan Rivers, OneRepublic, Ne-Yo, Flo Rida, Frankie J, Blue Man Group, and Burton Crane

Winner | Runner-up | 3rd place

Finalist	Order	Result (September 13)
David Garibaldi and His CMYK's	1	4th
Tom Cotter	2	2nd
The Untouchables	3	6th
Joe Castillo	4	5th
William Close	5	3rd
Olate Dogs	6	1st

== Ratings ==
The following ratings are based upon those published by Nielsen Media Research after this season's broadcast:

Show	Episode	First air date	Rating (18–49)	Share (18–49)	Viewers (millions)	Timeslot rank	Nightly rank	Weekly rank
1	Los Angeles and St. Louis Auditions	May 14, 2012	3.7	10	10.48	1	2	16
2	San Francisco Auditions	May 15, 2012	3.4	10	10.58	2	2	15
3	New York Auditions (Part 1)	May 21, 2012	3.2	9	9.66	1	1	6
4	New York Auditions (Part 2)	May 22, 2012	3.3	9	9.44	1	2	7
5	Tampa Bay Auditions (Part 1)	May 28, 2012	2.8	8	9.96	1	1	3
6	St. Louis Auditions (Part 2)	May 29, 2012	3.7	10	11.51	1	1	1
7	Austin Auditions (Part 1)	June 4, 2012	3.3	10	12.22	1	1	2
8	Austin Auditions (Part 2)	June 5, 2012	3.5	11	12.55	1	1	1
9	Tampa Bay Auditions (Part 2)	June 12, 2012	3.0	8	11.18	2	2	4
10	Final Auditions	June 18, 2012	2.9	9	11.43	1	1	3
11	Las Vegas Week (Part 1)	June 25, 2012	3.0	8	10.45	1	1	3
12	Las Vegas Week (Part 2)	June 26, 2012	3.2	9	11.67	1	1	1
13	Las Vegas Week (Part 3)	June 27, 2012	2.8	9	10.66	1	1	2
14	Top 48, Week 1 (performances)	July 2, 2012	2.9	8	10.19	1	1	1
15	Top 48, Week 1 (results)	July 3, 2012	2.3	8	9.32	1	1	2
16	Top 48, Week 2 (performances)	July 10, 2012	2.8	9	10.69	2	2	2
17	Top 48, Week 2 (results)	July 11, 2012	2.0	6	8.08	1	1	6
18	Top 48, Week 3 (performances)	July 17, 2012	2.6	8	10.17	1	1	1
19	Top 48, Week 3 (results)	July 18, 2012	2.0	6	7.61	1	1	5
20	Top 48, Week 4 (performances)	July 24, 2012	2.7	8	10.43	1	1	4
21	Top 48, Week 4 (results)	July 25, 2012	2.2	6	8.76	1	1	5
22	YouTube Snapple Special	August 14, 2012	2.8	8	9.97	1	1	2
23	YouTube Snapple Special (results)	August 15, 2012	2.3	6	8.48	1	1	5
24	Wild Card	August 21, 2012	2.5	8	9.90	1	1	1
25	Wild Card (results)	August 22, 2012	2.3	7	8.60	1	1	2
26	Semifinals, Round 1 (performances)	August 28, 2012	2.5	7	9.89	1	1	1
27	Semifinals, Round 1 (results)	August 29, 2012	2.2	6	8.34	1	1	3
28	Semifinals, Round 2 (performances)	September 4, 2012	2.4	7	8.93	1	1	8
29	Semifinals, Round 2 (results)	September 6, 2012	1.9	6	7.87	1	1	10
30	Finals (performances)	September 12, 2012	2.9	8	11.05	1	1	12
31	Finale	September 13, 2012	2.4	7	10.59	1	1	19

== Controversy ==
America's Got Talent faced controversy during its seventh season when it emerged that one of its participants had made a false claim that hadn't been properly checked. Minnesota National Guard sergeant Tim Poe, who made an audition for the season, claimed that an audible stutter he had was the result of an injury he sustained while operating with a military unit serving the War in Afghanistan. Although he provided evidence to back his claim, both the Associated Press and Minnesota National Guard refuted the documentation he provided, making clear that his condition could not be verified as occurring during his service in Afghanistan. Although Poe advanced no further, production staff would have had to face the question of disqualifying him from advancing into later stages for submitting a lie that had been broadcast on national television.
