= Kerri Louise =

American stand-up comedian

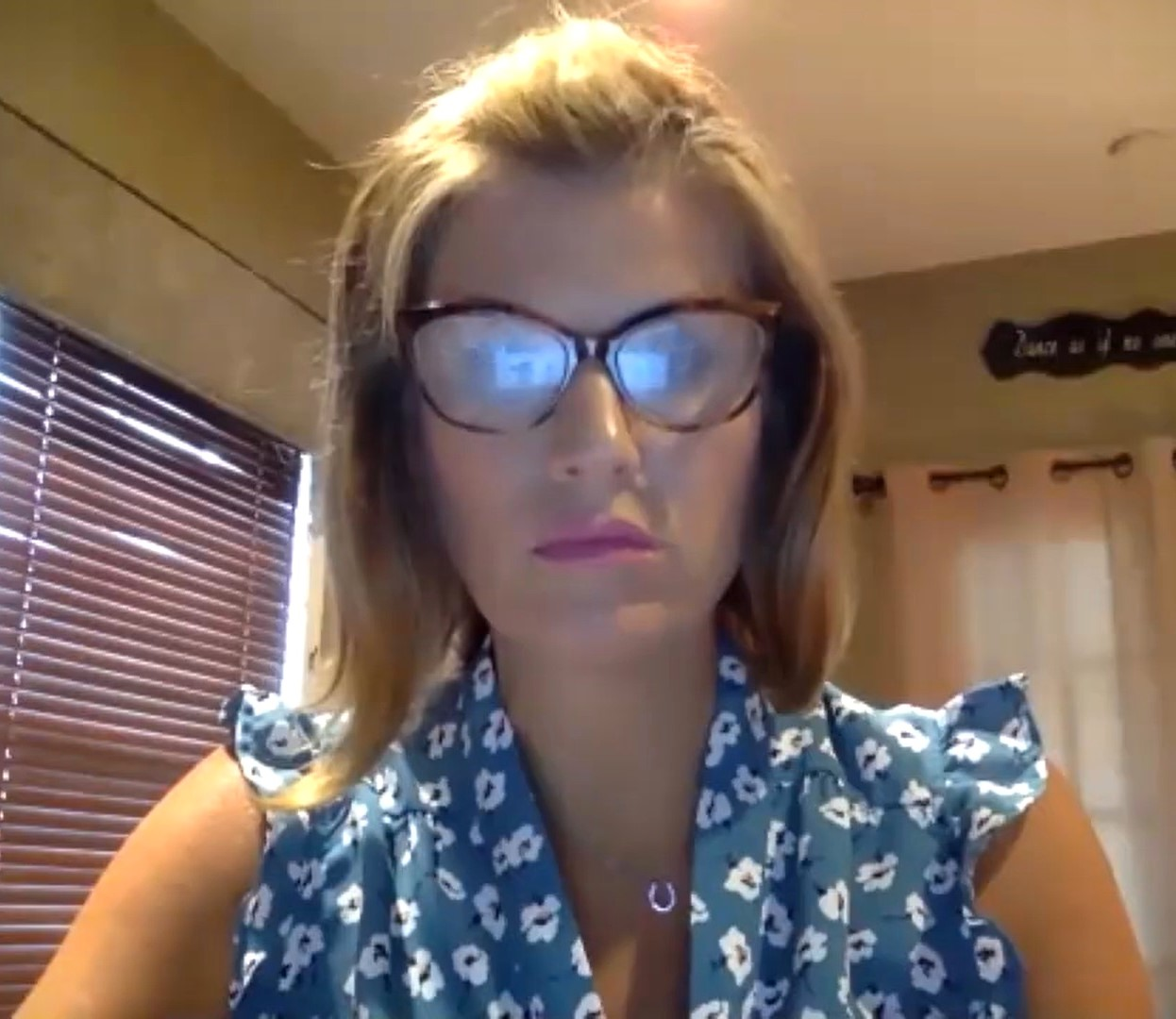
- Keri Louise Cotter in 2020
- Occupation: stand-up comedian
- Known for: finalist on the second season of Last Comic Standing
- Spouse: Tom Cotter
- Children: 3 sons

Kerri Louise is an American stand-up comedian. Louise was a finalist on the second season of Last Comic Standing and has appeared on television programs such as Tough Crowd with Colin Quinn and The View. Louise has performed at many of the leading comedy clubs throughout the world, including Caroline's, The TakeOut Comedy Club Hong Kong and The Comic Strip Live.

Louise is married to Tom Cotter, who is also a notable stand-up comedian. The two have three children, all of whom are boys. They have worked together on different projects including Two Funny, a 2006 reality show on WE tv.
