= America's Got Talent season 6 =

America's Got Talent
- Season 6
- Showrunner: Jason Raff
- Hosted by: Nick Cannon
- Judges: Piers Morgan; Sharon Osbourne; Howie Mandel
- Winner: Landau Eugene Murphy, Jr.
- Runner-up: Silhouettes
- Finals venue: CBS Television City
- No. of episodes: 32

Release
- Original network: NBC
- Original release: May 31 – September 14, 2011

Season chronology
- ← Previous; Season 5 Next → Season 7

Judges and Host for America's Got Talent Season 6

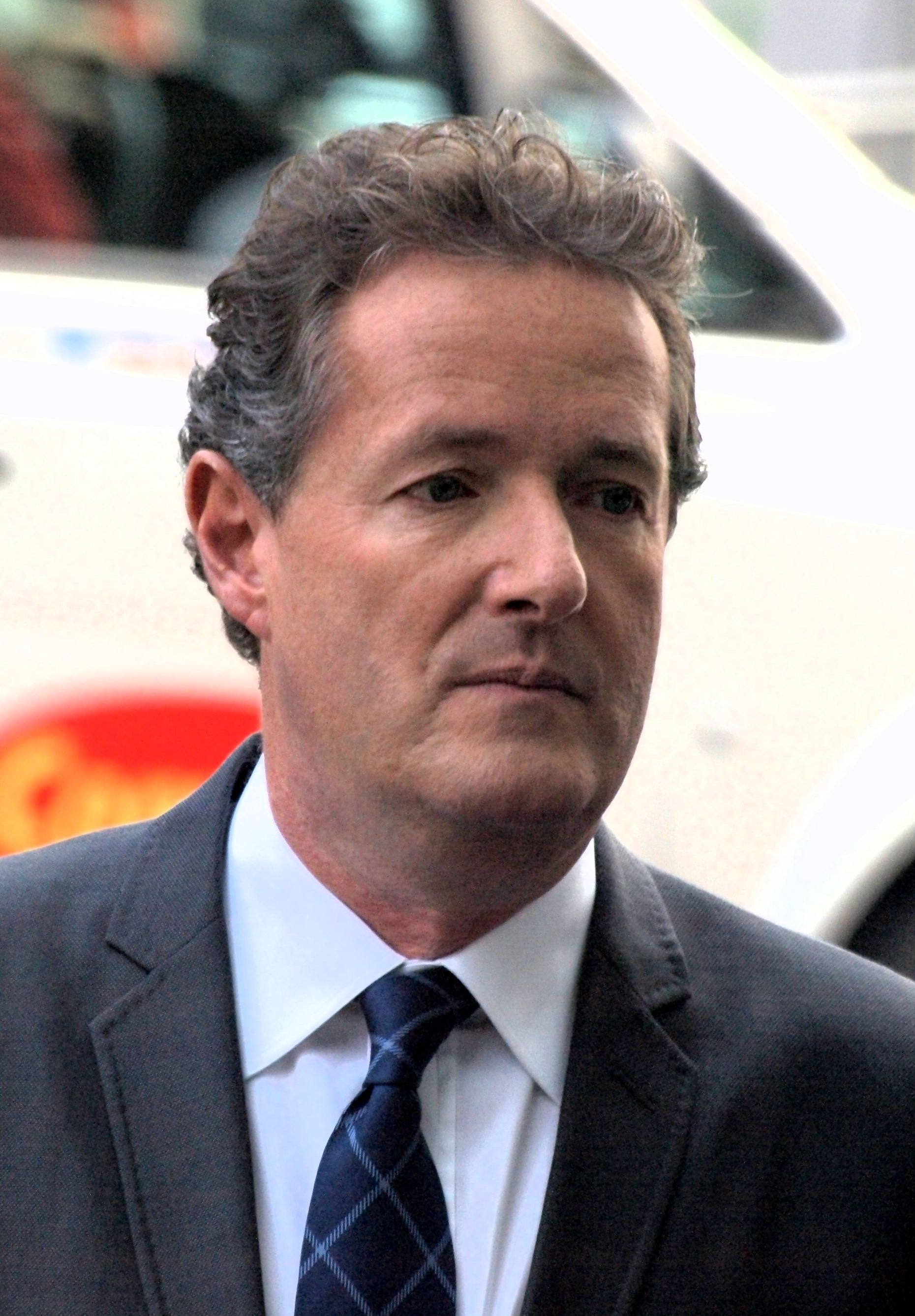
Piers Morgan

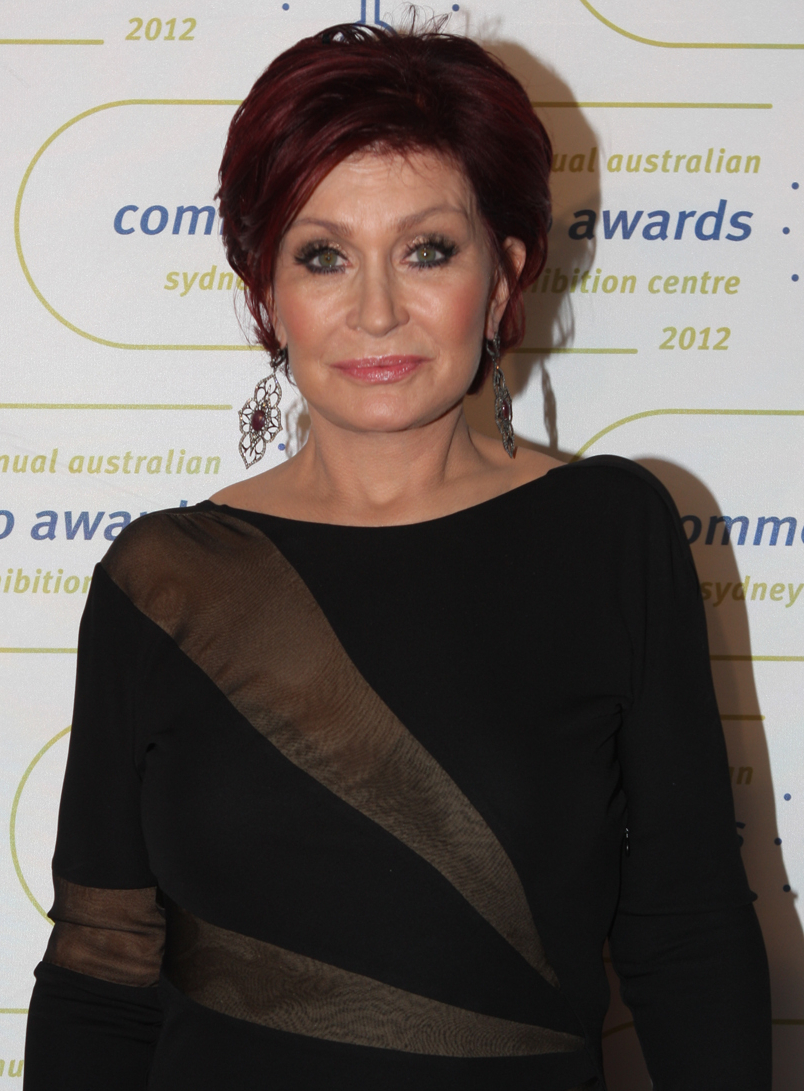
Sharon Osbourne

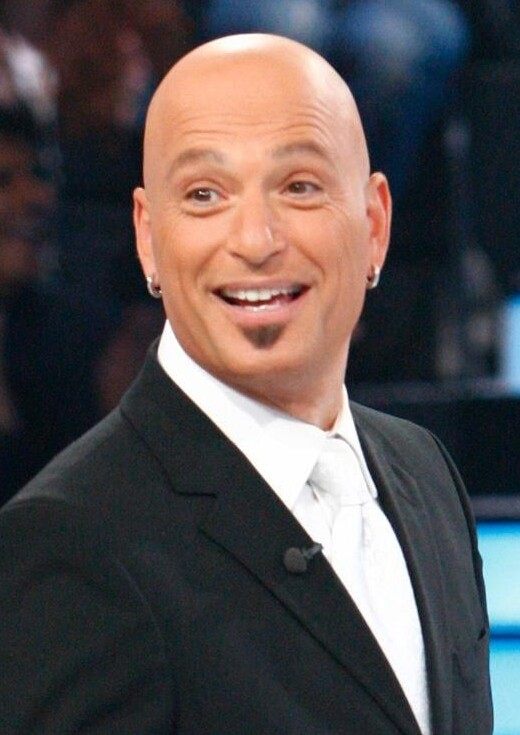
Howie Mandel

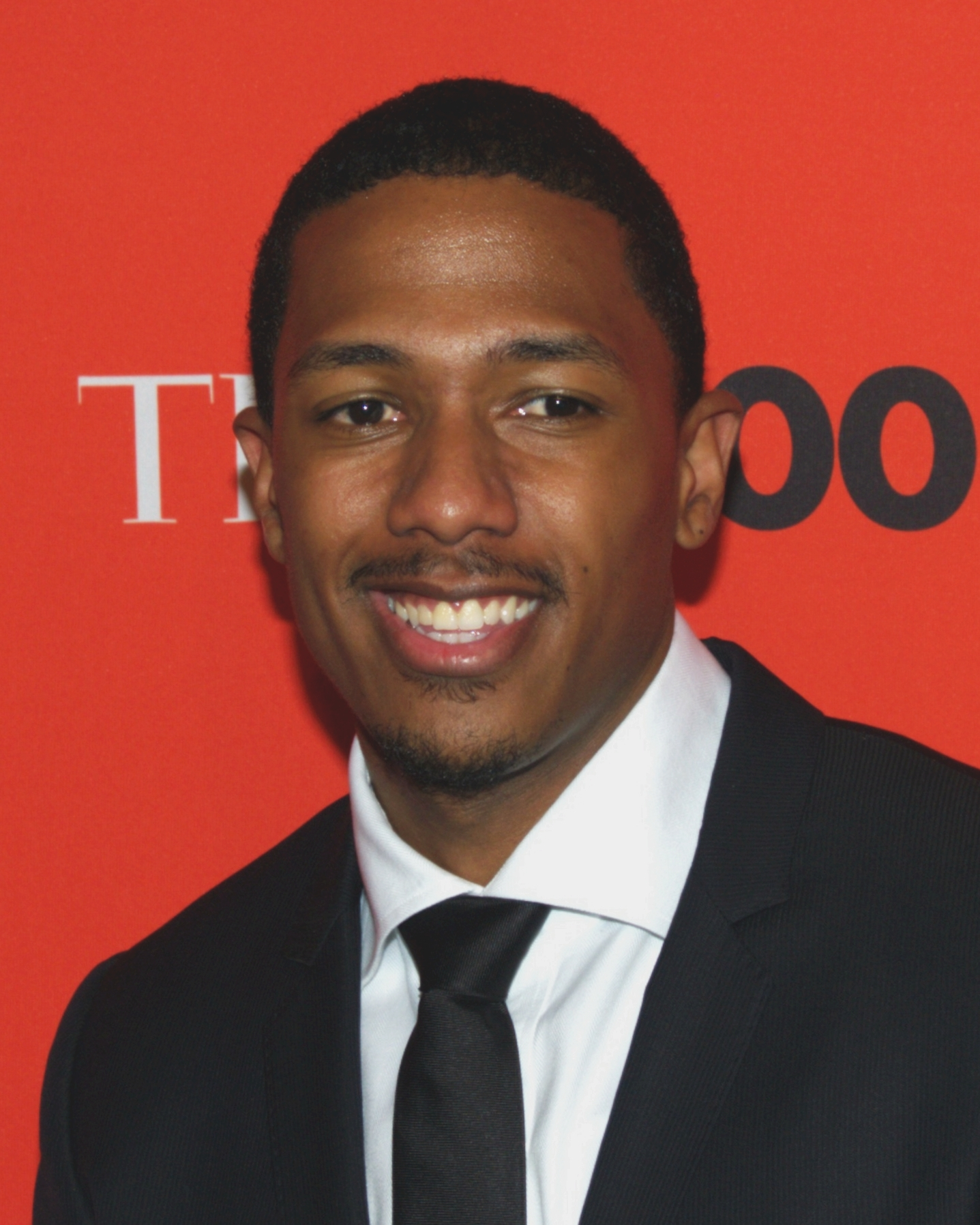
Nick Cannon

The sixth season of American talent show competition series America's Got Talent was broadcast on NBC from May 31 to September 14, 2011. No major changes were made in the program's format, although a number of participants who auditioned later dropped out due to obligations outside the competition. However, the season attracted media attention after one of its participants established a world record during their performance on the program.

The sixth season was won by jazz singer Landau Eugene Murphy, Jr., with silhouette dance group Silhouettes finishing in second, and glow-light dance group Team iLuminate placing third. During its broadcast, the season averaged around over 11.8 million viewers, with its opening episode attracting around 15.28 million viewers (the highest viewing figures for a season of America's Got Talent to premiere with).

== Season overview ==
Auditions for the sixth season's competition took place during Winter until mid-Spring 2011, in eight cities in the United States including Los Angeles, Atlanta, Houston, Seattle, Minneapolis, and New York. Auditions held within Denver and Chicago were not filmed. Due to weather conditions, Piers Morgan was unable to attend some of the auditions held in Minneapolis, though this did not disrupt production. The sixth season had a number of participants who auditioned, but dropped out despite securing a place in the live rounds, after determining that it would conflict with other obligations each had. In an interview held during May 2011 on Late Night with Jimmy Fallon, Howie Mandel said the program was the most dangerous, indicating that ambulances had to be called six times during auditions after a number of participants injured themselves during their act. One of the most significant events of this season involved Darren Taylor, who operated under his stage name of Professor Splash and established a new world record, during one of his live round performances for the highest shallow dive.

Of the participants who auditioned for the season, sixty-one secured a place in the live quarter-finals, with twelve quarter-finalists in each one. Eleven of the acts were given a second chance in the Wildcard quarter-final, after losing their initial quarter-final. About twenty-four advanced and were split between the two semi-finals, with ten semi-finalists securing a place in the finals, and four finalists securing a place in the grand-final. Below are the results of each participant's overall performance in the season:

Winner | Runner-up | Third place | Finalist | Semi-finalist
Quarter-finalist | Wildcard Quarter-finalist

| Participant | Age(s) ^{1} | Genre | Act | From | Quarter-Final | Result |
|---|---|---|---|---|---|---|
| Aeon | —N/a ^{3} | Acrobatics | Parkour Group | Los Angeles | 5 | Eliminated |
| Anna Graceman | 11 | Singing | Singer | Juneau, Alaska | 1 | Finalist |
| Attack Dance Crew | 19-25 | Dance | Dance Group | Tallahassee, Florida | 2 | Eliminated |
| Avery and the Calico Hearts | 9-10 | Music | Vocal Trio | Lubbock, Texas | 4 ^{2} | Eliminated |
| Beth Ann Robinson | 14 | Dance | Dancer | Dothan, Alabama | 5 | Semi-finalist |
| Breena Bell | 8 | Dance | Dancer | Lincoln, Alabama | 5 | Eliminated |
| Brett Daniels | 50 | Magic | Magician | Milwaukee, Wisconsin | 5 | Eliminated |
| Captain and Maybelle | 38 & 32 | Danger | Sideshow Duo | Douglasville, Georgia | 3 | Eliminated |
| Charles Peachock | 35 | Variety | Juggler | Kent, Ohio | 4 ^{2} | Eliminated |
| Dani Shay | 22 | Singing / Music | Singer & Guitarist | Orlando | 2 | Eliminated |
| Daniel Joseph Baker | 20 | Singing / Music | Singer & Pianist | Katy, Texas | 2 | Semi-finalist |
| Dezmond Meeks | 28 | Singing / Music | Singer & Pianist | Pineville, Louisiana | 1 | Eliminated |
| Duo Aero | 23 & 24 | Danger | Trapeze Duo | Saint Paul, Minnesota | 1 | Eliminated |
| Dylan Andre | 19 | Singing / Music | Singer & Guitarist | Zieglerville, Pennsylvania | 2 | Eliminated |
| Echo of Animal Gardens | 15 & 32 | Animals | Parrot Act | Lake Geneva, Wisconsin | 1 | Eliminated |
| Fatally Unique | 13-22 | Dance | Dance Group | Rockford, Illinois | 4 | Semi-finalist |
| Fearless Flores Family | 8-35 | Danger | Motorcycle Stunt Group | Myakka City, Florida | 1 | Eliminated |
| Frank Miles | 50 | Danger | Daredevil | San Francisco | 4 | Eliminated |
| Gabe Rocks | —N/a ^{3} | Animal | Dog Act | Bellingham, Washington | 5 | Eliminated |
| Geechy Guy | 46 | Comedy | Comedian | Rochester, Michigan | 2 | Eliminated |
| Gymkana | —N/a ^{3} | Acrobatics | Acrobatic Group | College Park, Maryland | 5 | Semi-finalist |
| Ian Johnson | 16 | Variety | Yo-Yoer | Hebron, Illinois | 3 | Eliminated |
| J. Chris Newberg | 41 | Comedy / Music | Comedian | Birmingham, Michigan | 1 ^{2} | Eliminated |
| Kalani Basketball Freestyle | 24 | Variety | Basketball Freestyler | Honolulu, Hawaii | 5 | Eliminated |
| Kevin Colis | 33 | Singing / Music | Singer & Guitarist | New Braunfels, Texas | 5 | Semi-finalist |
| Landau Eugene Murphy, Jr. | 35 | Singing | Jazz Singer | Logan County, West Virginia | 3 | Winner |
| Landon Swank | 26 | Magic | Magician | Wasilla, Alaska | 2 ^{2} | Finalist |
| Lys Agnès | 27 | Singing | Opera Singer | Denver | 3 | Finalist |
| Matt Wilhelm | 32 | Danger | Blacklight Biker | Chicago | 5 | Semi-finalist |
| Mauricio Herrera | 33 | Singing | Singer | Orange, California | 3 | Eliminated |
| Melissa Villaseñor | 23 | Comedy | Impressionist | Whittier, California | 4 | Semi-finalist |
| Miami All-Stars | 13-43 | Dance | Dance Group | Miami | 1 | Finalist |
| Mona Lisa | 29 | Singing | Vocal Duo | Santa Ana, California | 2 | Eliminated |
| Monét | 12 | Singing | Singer | Charlotte, North Carolina | 3 | Eliminated |
| POPLYFE | 12-16 | Singing / Music | Band | Oakland, California | 3 | Grand-finalist |
| Powerhouse | —N/a ^{3} | Singing | Choir | Burbank, California | 5 | Eliminated |
| Professor Splash ^{4} | 50 | Danger | High Diver | Denver | 3 | Semi-finalist |
| Purrfect Angelz | 22-36 | Dance | Dance Group | Los Angeles | 3 | Eliminated |
| Sam B | 32 | Dance | Dancer | Falls Church, Virginia | 4 | Eliminated |
| Sandou Trio Russian Bar | 25-43 | Acrobatics / Danger | Russian Bar Trio | San Antonio, Texas | 1 | Semi-finalist |
| Scott Alexander | 41 | Magic | Magician | Lancaster, Pennsylvania | 4 | Eliminated |
| Seth Grabel | 29 | Magic | Magician | Los Angeles | 3 ^{2} | Eliminated |
| SH'Boss Boys | 5-7 | Music | Rap Trio | Atlanta | 3 | Eliminated |
| Shevonne | 20 | Singing / Music | Singer & Guitarist | Tampa, Florida | 6 | Eliminated |
| Silhouettes | 4-18 | Dance | Shadow Dance Group | Denver | 2 | Runner-up |
| Smage Brothers Riding Shows | 18-25 | Danger | Stunt Motorcycle Group | Elkhorn, Wisconsin | 2 | Finalist |
| Snap Boogie | 18 | Dance | Dancer | Boston | 1 | Semi-finalist |
| Squonk Opera | 33-52 | Singing / Music | Operatic Band | Pittsburgh | 1 | Eliminated |
| Steven Retchless | 24 | Dance | Pole Dancer | Las Vegas | 2 | Semi-finalist |
| Summerwind Skippers | 22-36 | Variety | Jump Rope Group | Boise, Idaho | 3 ^{2} | Semi-finalist |
| Taylor Davis | 18 | Singing / Music | Singer & Guitarist | Leesburg, Georgia | 4 | Eliminated |
| Team iLuminate | 25-33 | Dance | Light-Up Dance Group | New York City | 4 | Third place |
| The Fiddleheads | 21-23 | Music | Bluegrass Band | Dahlonega, Georgia | 1 ^{2} | Eliminated |
| The Kinetic King | 47 | Variety | Kinetic Artist | Saint Paul, Minnesota | 4 ^{2} | Semi-finalist |
| The Rhinestone Ropers | 28 & 52 | Danger | Wild West Performers | Jerome, Idaho | 2 | Eliminated |
| Thomas John | 22 | Variety | Juggler | San Francisco | 2 | Eliminated |
| Those Funny Little People | 23-53 | Dance | Dance Group | Chicago | 1 ^{2} | Eliminated |
| TNC Elite | —N/a ^{3} | Dance | Clogging Group | Charlotte | 5 | Eliminated |
| West Springfield Dance Team | —N/a ^{3} | Dance | Dance Group | Springfield, Virginia | 5 ^{2} | Finalist |
| Yellow Designs Stunt Team | 25-41 | Danger | Stunt Bike Team | Monument, Colorado | 4 ^{2} | Eliminated |
| Zuma Zuma | 28-42 | Acrobatics | Acrobatic Group | Las Vegas | 4 | Semi-finalist |

- ^1 Ages denoted for a participant(s), pertain to their final performance for this season.
- ^2 These participants were entered into the Wildcard quarter-final after losing their initial quarter-final.
- ^3 The ages of these participants were not disclosed on the program.
- ^4 For health and safety reasons, Professor Splash had to perform outside the studio; judges were required view the performance in person, and used hand-carried signs in place of their buzzers.

=== Quarter-finals summary ===
Buzzed Out | Judges' choice | Advanced to Semi-finals
Won Judges' Vote | Lost Judges' Vote

==== Quarter-final 1 (July 12) ====
Guest Performers, Results Show: Avril Lavigne, and cast of Priscilla, Queen of the Desert.

| Quarter-Finalist | Order | Buzzes and Judges' votes | | | Result (July 13) |
| Quarter-Finalist | Order | Mandel | Osbourne | Morgan | Result (July 13) |
|---|---|---|---|---|---|
| Miami All-Stars | 1 | ^{5} | | | Won Judges' Vote |
| Dezmond Meeks | 2 | | | | Eliminated |
| Those Funny Little People | 3 | | | | Eliminated |
| Fearless Flores Family | 4 | | | | Eliminated |
| Squonk Opera | 5 | | | | Eliminated |
| J. Chris Newberg | 6 | | | | Eliminated |
| Snap Boogie | 7 | | | | Advanced |
| Echo of Animal Gardens | 8 | | | | Eliminated |
| The Fiddleheads | 9 | ^{5} | | | Lost Judges' Vote |
| Duo Aero | 10 | | | | Eliminated |
| Anna Graceman | 11 | | | | Advanced |
| Sandou Trio Russian Bar | 12 | | | | Advanced |

- ^5 Because of the majority vote for Miami All-Stars, Mandel's voting intention was not revealed.

==== Quarter-final 2 (July 19) ====
Guest Performers, Results Show: Hot Chelle Rae, and TRACES

| Quarter-Finalist | Order | Buzzes and Judges' votes | | | Result (July 20) |
| Quarter-Finalist | Order | Mandel | Osbourne | Morgan | Result (July 20) |
|---|---|---|---|---|---|
| Attack Dance Crew | 1 | | | | Eliminated |
| Dani Shay | 2 | | | | Eliminated |
| Geechy Guy | 3 | | | | Eliminated |
| Daniel Joseph Baker | 4 | | | | Advanced |
| The Rhinestone Ropers | 5 | | | | Eliminated |
| Dylan Andre | 6 | | | | Eliminated |
| Landon Swank | 7 | | | | Lost Judges' Vote |
| Smage Brothers Riding Shows | 8 | | | | Won Judges' Vote |
| Thomas John | 9 | | | | Eliminated |
| Steven Retchless | 10 | | | | Advanced |
| Mona Lisa | 11 | | | | Eliminated |
| Silhouettes | 12 | | | | Advanced |

==== Quarter-final 3 (July 26) ====
Guest Performers, Results Show: Stevie Nicks, Fighting Gravity, and The Smurfs

| Quarter-Finalist | Order | Buzzes and Judges' votes | | | Result (July 27) |
| Quarter-Finalist | Order | Mandel | Osbourne | Morgan | Result (July 27) |
|---|---|---|---|---|---|
| Summerwind Skippers | 1 | | | | Eliminated |
| SH'Boss Boys | 2 | | | | Eliminated |
| Mauricio Herrera | 3 | | | | Eliminated |
| Seth Grabel | 4 | | | | Lost Judges' Vote |
| POPLYFE | 5 | | | | Advanced |
| Ian Johnson | 6 | | | | Eliminated |
| Landau Eugene Murphy, Jr. | 7 | | | | Advanced |
| Purrfect Angelz | 8 | | | | Eliminated |
| Monét | 9 | | | | Eliminated |
| Captain and Maybelle | 10 | | | | Eliminated |
| Lys Agnès | 11 | | | | Advanced |
| Professor Splash | 12 | | | | Won Judges' Vote |

==== Quarter-final 4 (August 2) ====
Guest performers, Results Show: Maroon 5, and Jason Derülo

| Quarter-Finalist | Order | Buzzes and Judges' votes | | | Result (August 3) |
| Quarter-Finalist | Order | Mandel | Osbourne | Morgan | Result (August 3) |
|---|---|---|---|---|---|
| The Kinetic King | 1 | | | | Eliminated |
| Zuma Zuma | 2 | | | | Advanced |
| Avery and the Calico Hearts | 3 | | | | Eliminated |
| Charles Peachock | 4 | | | | Lost Judges' Vote |
| Sam B | 5 | | | | Eliminated |
| Taylor Davis | 6 | | | | Eliminated |
| Melissa Villaseñor | 7 | | | | Won Judges' Vote |
| Scott Alexander | 8 | | | | Eliminated |
| Fatally Unique | 9 | | | | Advanced |
| Yellow Designs Stunt Team | 10 | | | | Eliminated |
| Frank Miles | 11 | | | | Eliminated |
| Team iLuminate | 12 | | | | Advanced |

==== Quarter-final 5 - YouTube Round (August 9) ====
Guest performers, Results Show: OK Go and Pilobolus, Keenan Cahill, Rebecca Black, Tay Zonday, and Up and Over It.

| Quarter-Finalist | Order | Buzzes and Judges' votes | | | Result (August 10) |
| Quarter-Finalist | Order | Mandel | Osbourne | Morgan | Result (August 10) |
|---|---|---|---|---|---|
| TNC Elite | 1 | | | | Eliminated |
| Brett Daniels | 2 | | | | Eliminated |
| Gabe Rocks | 3 | | | | Eliminated |
| Aeon | 4 | | | | Eliminated |
| Breena Bell | 5 | | | | Eliminated |
| Kevin Colis | 6 | | | | Advanced |
| Beth Ann Robinson | 7 | | | | Won Judges' Vote |
| Gymkana | 8 | | | | Advanced |
| Kalani Basketball Freestyle | 9 | | | | Eliminated |
| West Springfield Dance Team | 10 | | | | Lost Judges' Vote |
| Matt Wilhelm | 11 | | | | Advanced |
| Powerhouse | 12 | | | | Eliminated |

==== Quarter-final 6 - Wild Card Round (August 16) ====
Guest Performers, Results Show: Colbie Caillat, and cast of Les Misérables

| Quarter-Finalist | Order | Buzzes and Judges' votes | | | Result (August 17) |
| Quarter-Finalist | Order | Mandel | Osbourne | Morgan | Result (August 17) |
|---|---|---|---|---|---|
| The Kinetic King | 1 | | | | Advanced |
| Those Funny Little People | 2 | | | | Eliminated |
| Avery and the Calico Hearts | 3 | | | | Eliminated |
| Seth Grabel | 4 | | | | Eliminated |
| Shevonne | 5 | | | | Eliminated |
| West Springfield Dance Team | 6 | | | | Advanced |
| J. Chris Newberg | 7 | | | | Eliminated |
| Yellow Designs Stunt Team | 8 | | | | Eliminated |
| Charles Peachock | 9 | | | | Eliminated |
| The Fiddleheads | 10 | | | | Lost Judges' Vote |
| Summerwind Skippers | 11 | | | | Won Judges' Vote |
| Landon Swank | 12 | | | | Advanced |

=== Semi-finals summary ===
Buzzed Out | Judges' choice | Advanced to Top 10
Won Judges' Vote | Lost Judges' Vote

==== Semi-final 1 (August 23) ====
Guest Performers, Results Show: Demi Lovato, Prince Poppycock, and New Boyz

| Semi-Finalist | Order | Buzzes and Judges' votes | | | Result (August 24) |
| Semi-Finalist | Order | Mandel | Osbourne | Morgan | Result (August 24) |
|---|---|---|---|---|---|
| Zuma Zuma | 1 | | | | Eliminated |
| Beth Ann Robinson | 2 | | | | Eliminated |
| Sandou Trio Russian Bar | 3 | | | | Eliminated |
| Kevin Colis | 4 | | | | Eliminated |
| Matt Wilhelm | 5 | | | | Eliminated |
| POPLYFE | 6 | | | | Advanced |
| West Springfield Dance Team | 7 | | ^{6} | | Won Judges' Vote |
| Melissa Villaseñor | 8 | | | | Eliminated |
| Team iLuminate | 9 | | | | Advanced |
| Daniel Joseph Baker | 10 | | ^{6} | | Lost Judges' Vote |
| Miami All-Stars | 11 | | | | Advanced |
| Lys Agnès | 12 | | | | Advanced |

- ^6 Because of the majority vote for West Springfield Dance Team, Osbourne's voting intention was not revealed.

==== Semi-final 2 (August 30) ====
Guest Performers, Results Show: David Guetta, Flo Rida, Nicki Minaj, and Susan Boyle

| Semi-Finalist | Order | Buzzes and Judges' votes | | | Result (August 31) |
| Semi-Finalist | Order | Mandel | Osbourne | Morgan | Result (August 31) |
|---|---|---|---|---|---|
| The Kinetic King | 1 | | | | Eliminated |
| Fatally Unique | 2 | | | | Eliminated |
| Landon Swank | 3 | | | | Advanced |
| Gymkana^{7} | 4 | | | | Eliminated |
| Summerwind Skippers | 5 | | | | Eliminated |
| Snap Boogie | 6 | | | | Lost Judges' Vote |
| Anna Graceman | 7 | | | | Advanced |
| Steven Retchless | 8 | | | | Eliminated |
| Smage Brothers Riding Shows | 9 | | | | Won Judges' Vote |
| Professor Splash | 10 | | | | Eliminated |
| Landau Eugene Murphy, Jr. | 11 | | | | Advanced |
| Silhouettes | 12 | | | | Advanced |

- ^7 Gymkana's performance was stopped early when one of the group members caught on fire while attempting to flip through the fire hoop, taking it down in the process.

=== Finals summary ===
Winner (Top 4 Final Only) | Runner-up (Top 4 Final Only) | 3rd place (Top 4 Final Only)
Advanced (Top 10 Finals only) | Eliminated | Buzzed Out (Top 10 Finals Only)

==== Final - Top 10 (September 6) ====
Guest Performers: Michael Grimm (Performance Episode); and Il Divo (Results Show).

| Top 10 Finalist | Order | Buzzes | | | Result (September 7) |
| Top 10 Finalist | Order | Mandel | Osbourne | Morgan | Result (September 7) |
|---|---|---|---|---|---|
| Miami All-Stars | 1 | | | | Eliminated |
| Lys Agnès | 2 | | | | Eliminated |
| Landon Swank | 3 | | | | Eliminated |
| Anna Graceman | 4 | | | | Eliminated |
| Silhouettes | 5 | | | | Advanced |
| Smage Brothers Riding Shows | 6 | | | | Eliminated |
| POPLYFE | 7 | | | | Advanced |
| West Springfield Dance Team | 8 | | | | Eliminated |
| Landau Eugene Murphy, Jr. | 9 | | | | Advanced |
| Team iLuminate | 10 | | | | Advanced |

==== Grand-final (September 13) ====
Guest Performers: Terry Fator (Performance Episode); Def Leppard, OneRepublic, Tony Bennett and Queen Latifah, cast of Cirque du Soleil's Iris, and Jackie Evancho (Results Show).

| Grand-finalist | Order | Performed with | Result (September 14) |
|---|---|---|---|
| Landau Eugene Murphy, Jr. | 1 | Patti LaBelle | 1st |
| Team iLuminate | 2 | Cobra Starship | 3rd |
| POPLYFE | 3 | Stevie Wonder | 4th |
| Silhouettes | 4 | LeAnn Rimes | 2nd |

== Ratings ==
The following ratings are based upon those published by Nielsen Media Research after this season's broadcast:

| Order | Episode(s) | Airdate | Rating | Share | Rating/Share (18–49) | Viewers (millions) | Rank (Timeslot) | Rank (Night) (18–49) | Rank (Night) (Total viewers) | Rank (Week) (Total viewers) |
|---|---|---|---|---|---|---|---|---|---|---|
| 1 | "Los Angeles Auditions & Atlanta Auditions" | May 31, 2011 | 8.8 | 14 | 4.3/12 | 15.28 | #1 | #3 | #1 | #3 |
| 2 | "Seattle Auditions" | June 7, 2011 | 7.4 | 13 | 3.7/12 | 12.93 | #1 | #3 | #2 | #5 |
| 3; 4 | "Houston Auditions" "Minneapolis Auditions" | June 8, 2011 | 7.1 | 12 | 3.7/10 | 12.64 | #1 | #1 | #1 | #6 |
| 5 | "Seattle Auditions" (Part 2) | June 14, 2011 | 7.3 | 12 | 3.5/11 | 12.59 | #1 | #2 | #1 | #1 |
| 6 | "Atlanta Auditions" (Part 2) | June 21, 2011 | 7.1 | 12 | 3.4/11 | 12.30 | #1 | #2 | #1 | #2 |
| 7 | "New York Auditions" | June 22, 2011 | 7.5 | 12 | 3.9/11 | 13.49 | #1 | #1 | #1 | #1 |
| 8 | "New York Auditions" (Part 2) | June 28, 2011 | 7.3 | 13 | 3.3/11 | 12.46 | #1 | #2 | #1 | #3 |
| 9 | "Auditions Episode 9" | June 29, 2011 | 7.6 | 13 | 4.1/12 | 13.71 | #1 | #1 | #1 | #1 |
| 10 | "Final Auditions" | July 5, 2011 | 7.2 | 12 | 3.6/11 | 12.59 | #1 | #2 | #2 | #4 |
| 11 | "Las Vegas Week" (Part 1) | July 5, 2011 | 8.8 | 14 | 4.6/13 | 15.78 | #1 | #1 | #1 | #1 |
| 12 | "Las Vegas Week" (Part 2) | July 6, 2011 | 7.3 | 12 | 3.6/11 | 12.85 | #1 | #1 | #1 | #3 |
| 13 | "Quarterfinals, Week 1" | July 12, 2011 | 7.9 | 13 | 4.0/11 | 14.07 | #1 | #1 | #1 | #1 |
| 14 | "Quarterfinals, Week 1" (Results) | July 13, 2011 | 6.8 | 11 | 3.0/9 | 11.43 | #1 | #1 | #1 | #2 |
| 15 | "Quarterfinals, Week 2" | July 19, 2011 | 7.3 | 12 | 3.6/10 | 13.04 | #1 | #1 | #1 | #1 |
| 16 | "Quarterfinals, Week 2" (Results) | July 20, 2011 | 5.9 | 10 | 2.7/8 | 10.32 | #1 | #1 | #1 | #2 |
| 17 | "Quarterfinals, Week 3" | July 26, 2011 | 6.6 | 11 | 3.1/9 | 11.54 | #1 | #1 | #1 | #1 |
| 18 | "Quarterfinals, Week 3" (Results) | July 27, 2011 | 6.0 | 10 | 2.8/8 | 10.74 | #1 | #1 | #1 | #2 |
| 19 | "Quarterfinals, Week 4" | August 2, 2011 | 6.8 | 11 | 3.1/9 | 11.92 | #1 | #1 | #1 | #1 |
| 20 | "Quarterfinals, Week 4" (Results) | August 3, 2011 | 5.8 | 10 | 2.5/7 | 9.96 | #1 | #2 | #1 | #2 |
| 21 | "Quarterfinals, YouTube" | August 9, 2011 | 6.6 | 11 | 3.0/8 | 11.46 | #1 | #1 | #1 | #1 |
| 22 | "Quarterfinals, YouTube" (Results) | August 10, 2011 | 5.7 | 9 | 2.5/7 | 9.73 | #1 | #1 | #1 | #3 |
| 23 | "Quarterfinals, Wildcard Show" | August 16, 2011 | 6.0 | 10 | 2.8/5 | 10.40 | #1 | #1 | #1 | #2 |
| 24 | "Quarterfinals, Wildcard Show" (Results) | August 17, 2011 | 5.6 | 9 | 2.5/7 | 9.74 | #1 | #2 | #1 | #3 |
| 25 | "Semifinals, Round 1" | August 23, 2011 | 7.0 | 11 | 3.3/9 | 11.99 | #1 | #1 | #1 | #1 |
| 26 | "Semifinals, Round 1" (Results) | August 24, 2011 | 6.4 | 10 | 2.9/8 | 11.12 | #1 | #1 | #1 | #2 |
| 27 | "Semifinals, Round 2" | August 30, 2011 | 6.8 | 11 | 3.1/8 | 11.14 | #1 | #1 | #1 | #1 |
| 28 | "Semifinals, Round 2" (Results) | August 31, 2011 | 6.5 | 10 | 2.6/7 | 10.65 | #1 | #2 | #1 | #2 |
| 29 | "Top Ten" | September 6, 2011 | 7.1 | 11 | 3.1/8 | 11.85 | #1 | #1 | #1 | #9 |
| 30 | "Top Ten" (Results) | September 7, 2011 | 7.2 | 11 | 3.0/8 | 12.36 | #1 | #1 | #1 | #7 |
| 31 | "Finals, Performances" | September 13, 2011 | 8.1 | 13 | 3.8/10 | 13.67 | #1 | #1 | #1 | #4 |
| 32 | "Finale" | September 14, 2011 | 8.5 | 14 | 3.6/10 | 14.37 | #1 | #2 | #1 | #3 |
