= Ashley Strand =

- Born: Ashley Strand
- Notable work: Writer and star of Glorified Disasters

Comedy career
- Medium: Stand-up

Ashley Strand is an American actor and stand-up comedian based in Wilmington, North Carolina.

== Biography ==
Ashley began his career in 1996, appearing in a low-budget, science fiction film, and began doing stand-up comedy in 2005. Ashley earned an MFA from Michael Kahn's Academy for Classical Acting, becoming the first ACA graduate to be cast at The Shakespeare Theatre, the United States' premiere classical theatre, where he appeared in The Duchess of Malfi, The Winter's Tale, and Two Gentlemen of Verona. He has performed all over the world, including at the Edinburgh Festival Fringe and was the winner of the 2009 HK International Comedy Festival. He has also written and performed three one-man shows.
