= ILuminate =

American theatrical and technology company

- Industry: Technology
- Founded: 2009
- Founder: Miral Kotb
- Headquarters: New York City, United States

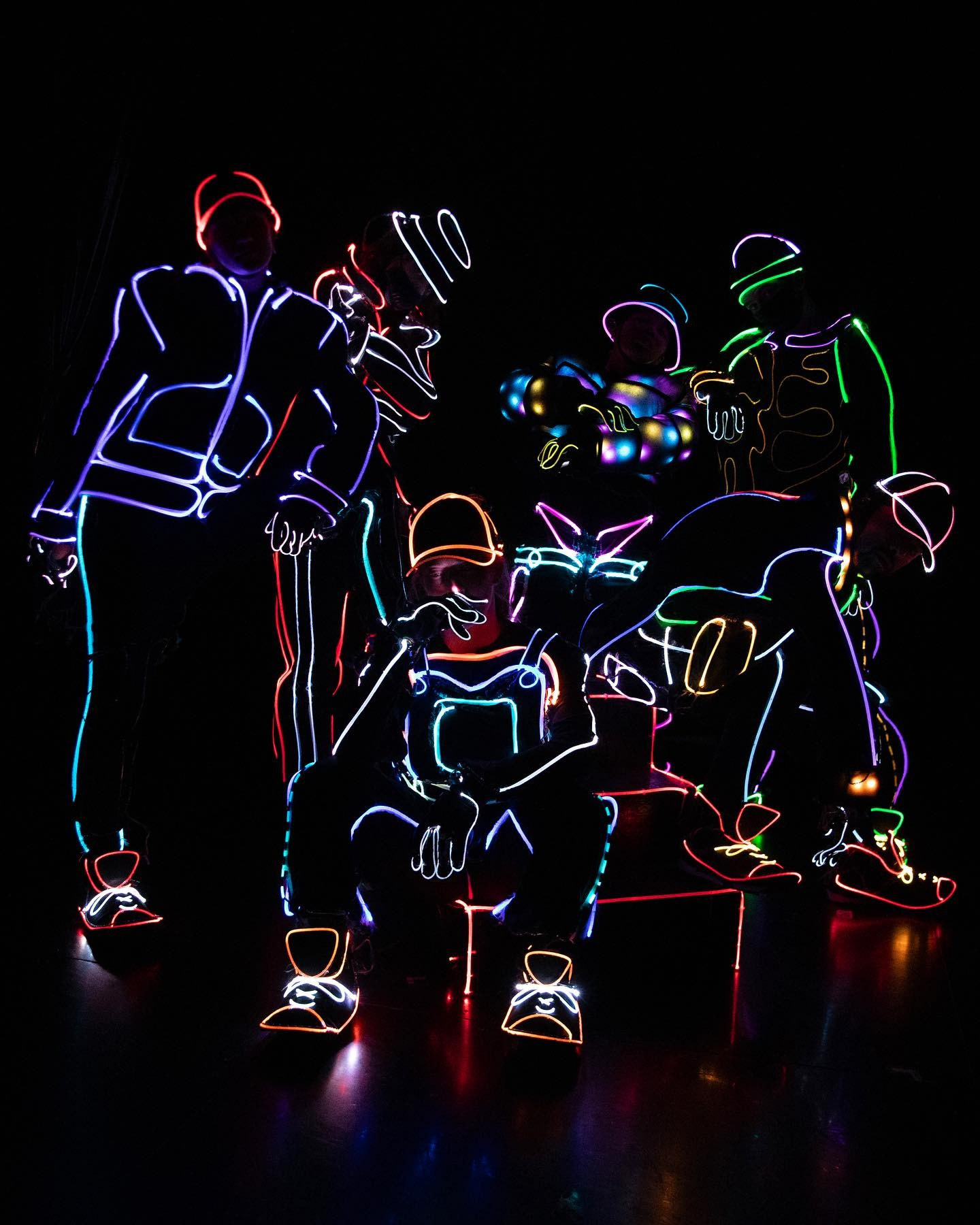
iLuminate dancers in light suits

iLuminate is a theatrical and technology company based in New York, New York, USA, best known for competing in the sixth season of America's Got Talent. They finished in third place.

The dancers were dressed in black and performed in the dark, but audience members were able to see them because the dancers' suits were covered in a mixture of electroluminescent wire and LEDs; the flashing lights that all the dancers wore were synchronized to display various effects.

== History ==
The company was founded in 2009 by Miral Kotb, a software engineer. By 2019, iLuminate had performed in over 15 countries.

=== Las Vegas show ===
On August 26, 2021, iLuminate held its first performance at The Strat in Las Vegas. The show blends music, dance, technology and art with dancers that wear special light suits.

iLuminate held its 100th show on March 6, 2022, at The STRAT Theater.
