= Landau Eugene Murphy Jr. =

American singer (born 1974)

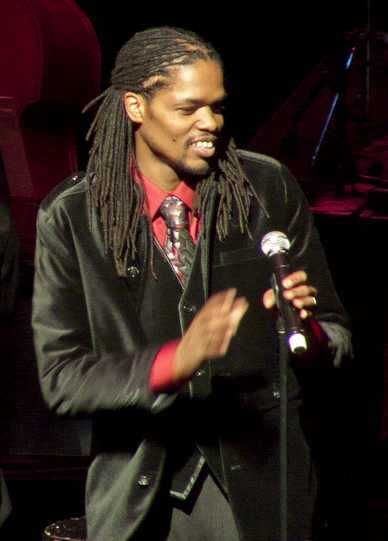
- Murphy performing in December 2011

Background information
- Born: August 11, 1974 (age 52)
- Origin: Logan County, West Virginia, United States
- Genres: Jazz
- Occupation: Singer
- Instrument: Vocals
- Years active: 2010–present
- Labels: Sony (2011–present); Columbia (2011–present)
- Website: landaumurphyjr.com
- Spouse: Peyton Konchesky

Landau Eugene Murphy Jr. (born August 11, 1974) is an American jazz singer from Logan County, West Virginia. He received national attention for winning the sixth season of the NBC reality show America's Got Talent. Landau has released a total of 4 albums since his victory in 2011. Landau has performed around the world, including Shanghai, China, in 2013 and at the World Expo in Dubai in 2022. Landau continues to perform around the country annually and wraps up every year with a Holiday tour across his home state. In 2014 Landau was listed in the Jaycees Ten Outstanding Young Americans list.

== Early life, family and education ==
Murphy's hometown is Logan, West Virginia. His grandfather was Rev. Cecil Murphy. He dropped out of high school during his 11th grade year. (Decades later, he earned his high school diploma during the COVID-19 pandemic.)

== Career ==
=== Before America's Got Talent ===
For 20 years, he struggled financially, living and working in West Virginia and Detroit, Michigan.

=== America's Got Talent ===
In November 2010, Murphy traveled to New York City for the audition. Before his time on television, in 2010, Landau's house was ransacked, leading him to audition for America's Got Talent in the only clothes he owned. He was selected as the winner of the show on September 14, 2011, after a performance of "My Way", a song popularized by Frank Sinatra. He won the $1 million grand prize and began a headlining act in Las Vegas on October 28.

==== Performances and results ====
| Week | Theme | Song choice | Original artist | Performance order | Result |
|---|---|---|---|---|---|
| Audition | | "I've Got You Under My Skin" | Frank Sinatra | N/A | Safe |
| Vegas Week | Judge's Favorites | "I Get a Kick out of You" | Ethel Merman | N/A | Safe |
| Top 48 | Quarter-finals | "Fly Me to the Moon" | Felicia Sanders | 7 | Safe |
| Top 24 | Semi-finals | "I've Got the World on a String" | Cab Calloway | 11 | Safe |
| Top 10 | Top Ten Finals | "Ain't That a Kick in the Head?" | Dean Martin | 9 | Safe |
| Top 4 | Finale | "My Way" | Frank Sinatra | 1 | Winner |

=== That's Life ===
After winning, Murphy signed to Sony Records and Columbia Records, and released his first album That's Life on November 21, 2011. The album debuted at No. 34 on the Billboard 200, selling 28,000 copies, then fell to No. 41 the next week on the charts. It debuted at number one on the Billboard jazz charts, and also reached No. 1 in the Jazz category on Amazon.com. By May 2017, the album had sold 156,000 copies.

Many have compared Murphy's vocals and phrasing to that of Frank Sinatra, a singer he has always admired. Many of the tracks from That's Life are Sinatra standards. Murphy said of the album, "For a lot of music fans, especially older people, I can bring back some happy memories. And hopefully I can create new memories for generations to come."

That's Life was produced by Steve Tyrell, himself an aficionado of Sinatra's music.

=== Performances ===
As part of his AGT prize, Murphy headlined a show in Las Vegas at the Colosseum Theater at Caesars Palace. He toured other locations including the Apollo Theater in New York City and the DTE Energy Center in Detroit with The Temptations. He was a headlining performer at the West Virginia and California State Fairs. Murphy made a Super Bowl appearance as well. He performed at The Hollywood Christmas Parade and a many sold-out shows in the US, many supporting local charities. Major media appearances have included The Today Show, The View, The Talk, The Wendy Williams Show, Fox and Friends, Anderson Cooper 360°, The Tom Joyner Show, Scott and Todd in the Morning on WPLJ, and Good Day LA.

Murphy has sung the national anthem at Madison Square Garden, WVU's Mountaineer Field, and at several other public events.

== Advocacy and charity work ==
=== Education advocacy ===
Landau is an advocate for adult education in his home state West Virginia and is part of its Department of Education's campaign It's Never Too Late to Graduate. campaign. He used his free time during the COVID-19 pandemic to earn his high school diploma. Landau continues to advocate for adult education, offering the official Landau Eugene Murphy Jr. Scholarship at Southern West Virginia Community and Technical College in Logan, West Virginia, his hometown.

=== Charity work ===
Following his win on America's Got Talent, Landau has hosted a series of charity events around the state of West Virginia. In 2014, he was listed in the Jaycees Ten Outstanding Young Americans list.

== Personal life ==
Murphy was married to Jennifer Carter, but they divorced in 2013. He began a relationship with Peyton Konchesky in 2020.

== Discography ==
=== Singles ===
| Title | Details | Peak chart positions | Sales |
| Title | Details | US | Sales |
|---|---|---|---|
| Come Home to West Virginia | Release date: June 20, 2016; Label: Columbia; Format: CD | — | |

=== Albums ===
| Title | Details | Peak chart positions | Sales |
| Title | Details | US | Sales |
|---|---|---|---|
| That's Life | Release date: November 21, 2011; Label: Columbia, Syco; Format: CD, digital download | 34 | US: 156,000 |
| Christmas Made for Two | Release date: November 5, 2013; Label: Self-released; Format: CD, digital download | — | |
| Landau | Release date: December 1, 2016; Label: WeberWorks; Format: CD, digital download | — | |
| I'M NOT MESSING AROUND | Release date: February 10, 2024; Label: LEM Records; Format: CD, digital download | — | |

| Preceded by Michael Grimm | America's Got Talent winner Season 6 (Summer 2011) | Succeeded by Olate Dogs |
