= Jami Gong =

Chinese American stand-up comedian

- Born: Jameson Gong; Chinatown, Manhattan
- Notable work: Producer and host of TakeOut Comedy

Comedy career
- Medium: Stand-up, Producer
- Website: www.takeoutcomedy.com

Jami Gong is a Chinese American stand-up comedian.

== Biography ==
Jameson ("Jami") Gong was born in 1969 and raised in New York City's Chinatown.

Jami's first attempt at stand-up comedy came on a dare while he attended Syracuse University. After graduating from Syracuse with a geography degree, Jami moved back into his family's brownstone in Chinatown. He made a living selling sports souvenirs at Madison Square Garden, and in later years, working at a chain of men's clothing stores around New York City. At nights, Jami performed stand-up comedy, although he did not perform from 1993 to 1999 as a result of a poor autism-induced performance that affected his confidence. He returned to stand-up after vowing to his sick grandmother that he would live life to the fullest.

In 1999, Jami, along with several friends, created www.ChinatownNYC.com, a website featuring information about Chinatown. Jami also became a licensed tour guide and conducted acclaimed walking tours in Chinatown. Later, Jami made stand-up comedy his full-time profession. He has appeared at comedy clubs all over the world, as well as on Late Night with Conan O'Brien.

In 2005, Jami produced the first National Asian Comedy tour, and also took the tour overseas to Asia. In February 2007, Jami founded The TakeOut Comedy Club Hong Kong, which is the first full-time comedy club in Asia. In 2009, the club expanded its operations to conduct shows in Macau and the Philippines.

== Miscellaneous ==
In 1995, Jami was knighted by the country of Malta. In 2004, Jami carried the Olympic flame through Lower Manhattan as an official torchbearer for the 2004 Summer Olympics.
