= The TakeOut Comedy Club Hong Kong =

Comedy venue in Hong Kong

Coordinates: 22.2817°N 114.1526°E

TakeOut Comedy logo

The TakeOut Comedy Club Hong Kong is a venue for stand-up comedy and improvisational comedy located at 34 Elgin Street, basement, Central, Hong Kong. Founded in February 2007 by Jami Gong, a leading Chinese American stand-up comedian, TakeOut Comedy is the first full-time comedy club in Asia. The club fosters local English and Cantonese-speaking talent and has hosted well-known comedians from around the world, including Tim Jones, Ted Alexandro, Al Ducharme, Butch Bradley Tom Cotter and Paul Ogata.
