= Tom Cotter (comedian) =

American stand-up comedian

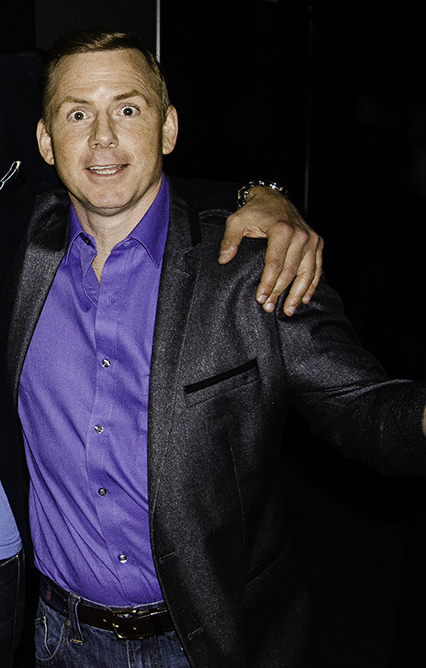
- Cotter at Comics Come Home Event in 2013
- Born: Thomas Cotter; Providence, Rhode Island, U.S.
- Education: Denison University
- Spouse: Kerri Louise
- Children: 3

Comedy career
- Years active: 1987–present
- Medium: Stand-up
- Website: tomcotter.com

Thomas Cotter is an American comedian known for being the runner-up of the seventh season of America's Got Talent, losing to Olate Dogs.

== Early and personal life ==
Cotter was raised in the East Side enclave of Providence, Rhode Island as the youngest of six children. His father, Dr. Walter C. Cotter (1923-2021), was a World War II navy veteran and later became a well-regarded neurosurgeon. His mother, Barbara Cotter, was a homemaker and managed his father's medical office. Cotter attended the Moses Brown School in Providence, and Denison University for his undergraduate degree.

Cotter is married to Kerri Louise, who is also a stand-up comedian, and the two have three sons. They have worked together on different projects including Two Funny, a reality show on Women's Entertainment network.

== Career ==
He has appeared on The Tonight Show with Jay Leno, The Late Late Show with Craig Ferguson and Last Comic Standing. In 2003, Cotter filmed his own half-hour special for Comedy Central. Cotter has won several comedy competitions. In 1994, he won Seattle's International Stand-Up Comedy Competition. He gained his first success in the Boston comedy scene, where he is still a favorite, and also won the grand prize at the Boston Comedy Festival and was voted Best Stand-Up at the Las Vegas Comedy Festival. Additionally, Cotter has worked in film, theatre, and television productions and, as of 2012, he was working on an idea for a book.

=== America's Got Talent ===
In 2012, Cotter appeared on season 7 of NBC's America's Got Talent. He was given a pass to Las Vegas by the show's three judges. He further advanced to the top 48 (quarterfinals) to perform in the live episodes in Newark, New Jersey. On July 10, 2012, he performed a stand-up routine making fun of common clichés and phrases and advanced to the semi-finals. On August 28, 2012, he presented the judges with a list of subjects and asked judge Howie Mandel to pick one. Mandel picked "College", and Cotter then gave a short comedy set on the subject of college and teenagers. He advanced to the final round of six and was the runner-up of the season. On August 21, 2013, Cotter returned to the show to perform on the results show of that night.
