= America's Got Talent season 9 =

America's Got Talent
- Season 9
- Showrunners: Jason Raff; Sam Donnelly
- Hosted by: Nick Cannon
- Judges: Howard Stern; Heidi Klum; Mel B; Howie Mandel
- Winner: Mat Franco
- Runner-up: Emily West
- Finals venue: Radio City Music Hall
- No. of episodes: 32

Release
- Original network: NBC
- Original release: May 27 – September 17, 2014

Season chronology
- ← Previous; Season 8 Next → Season 10

Judges and Host for America's Got Talent Season 9

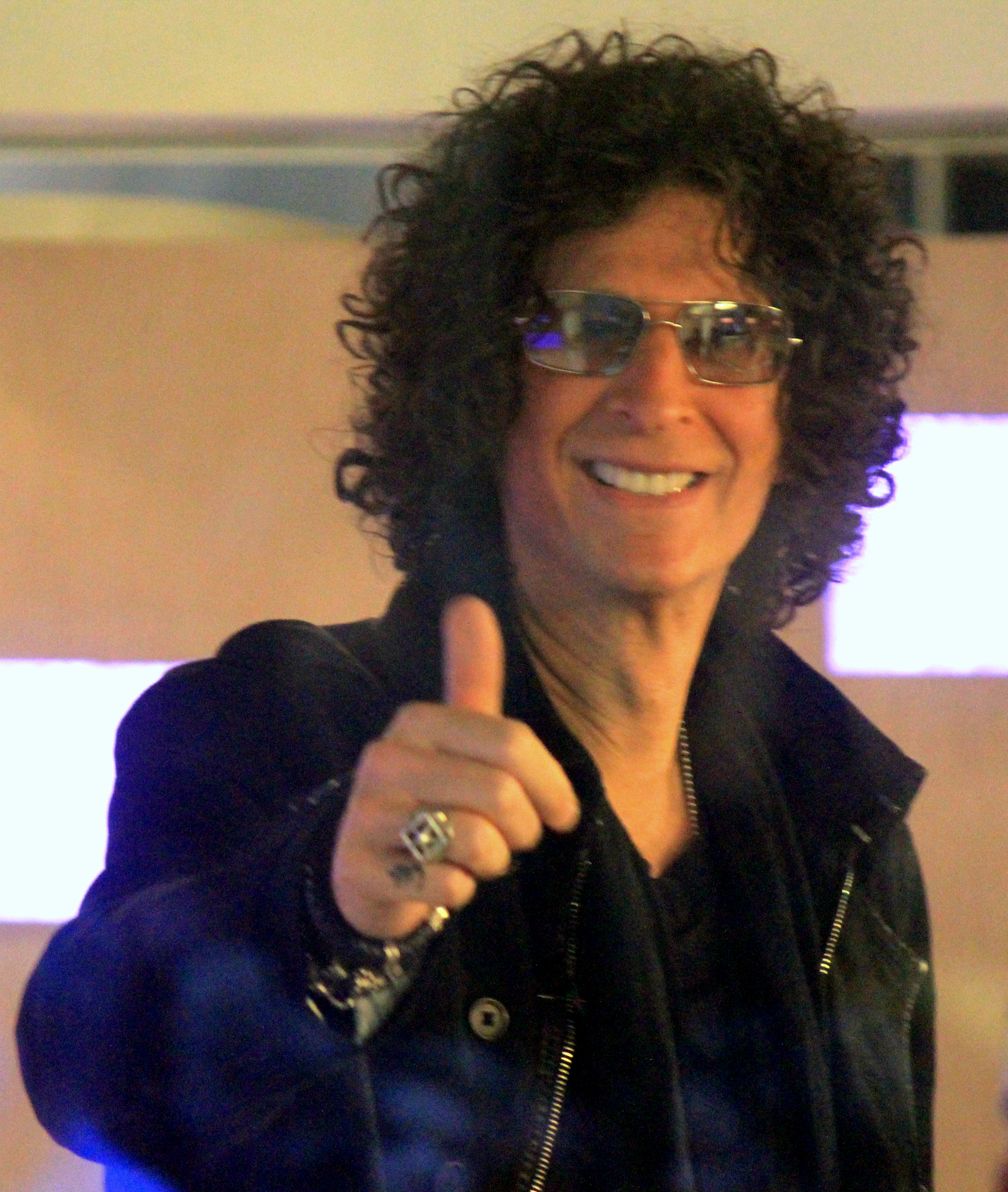
Howard Stern

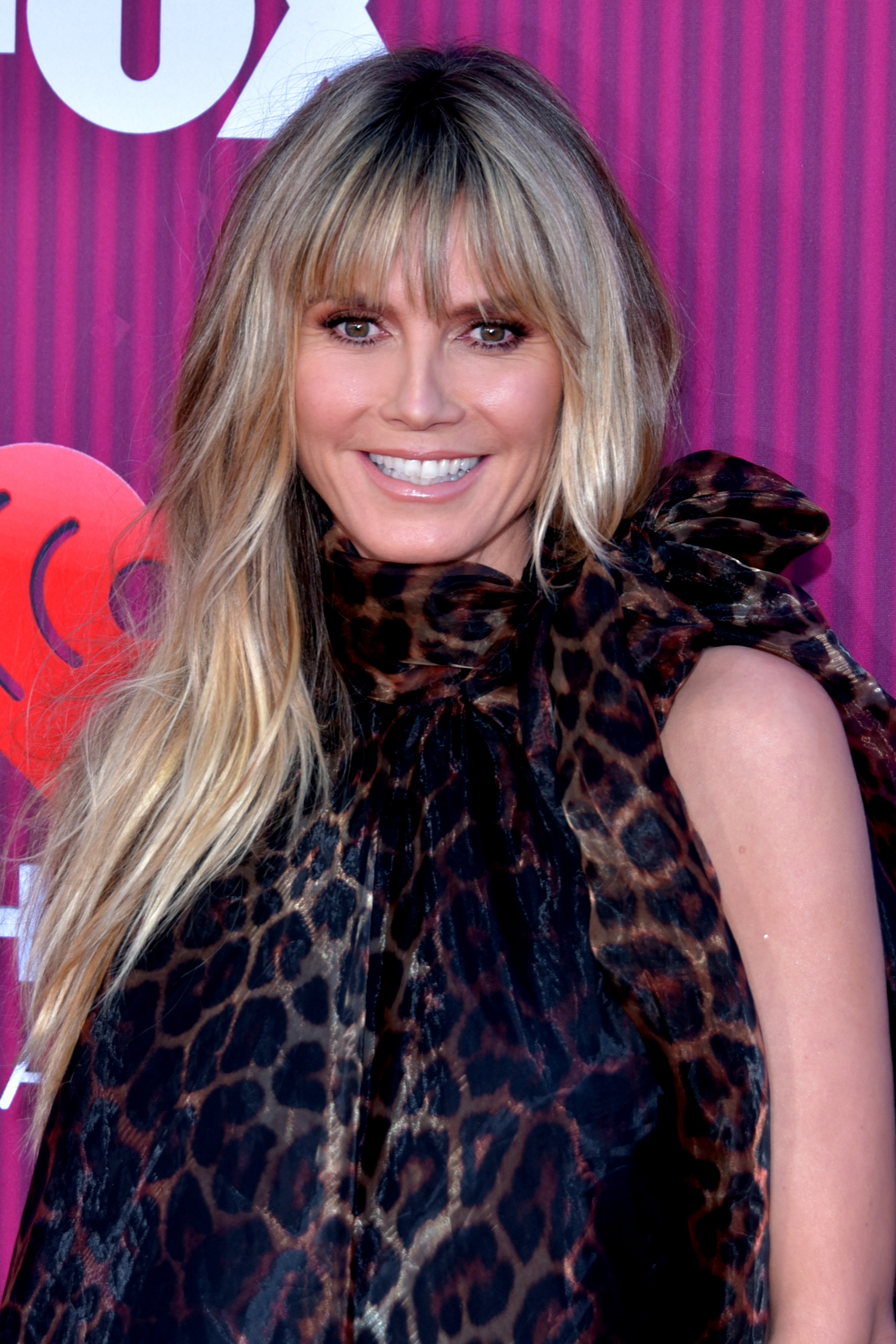
Heidi Klum

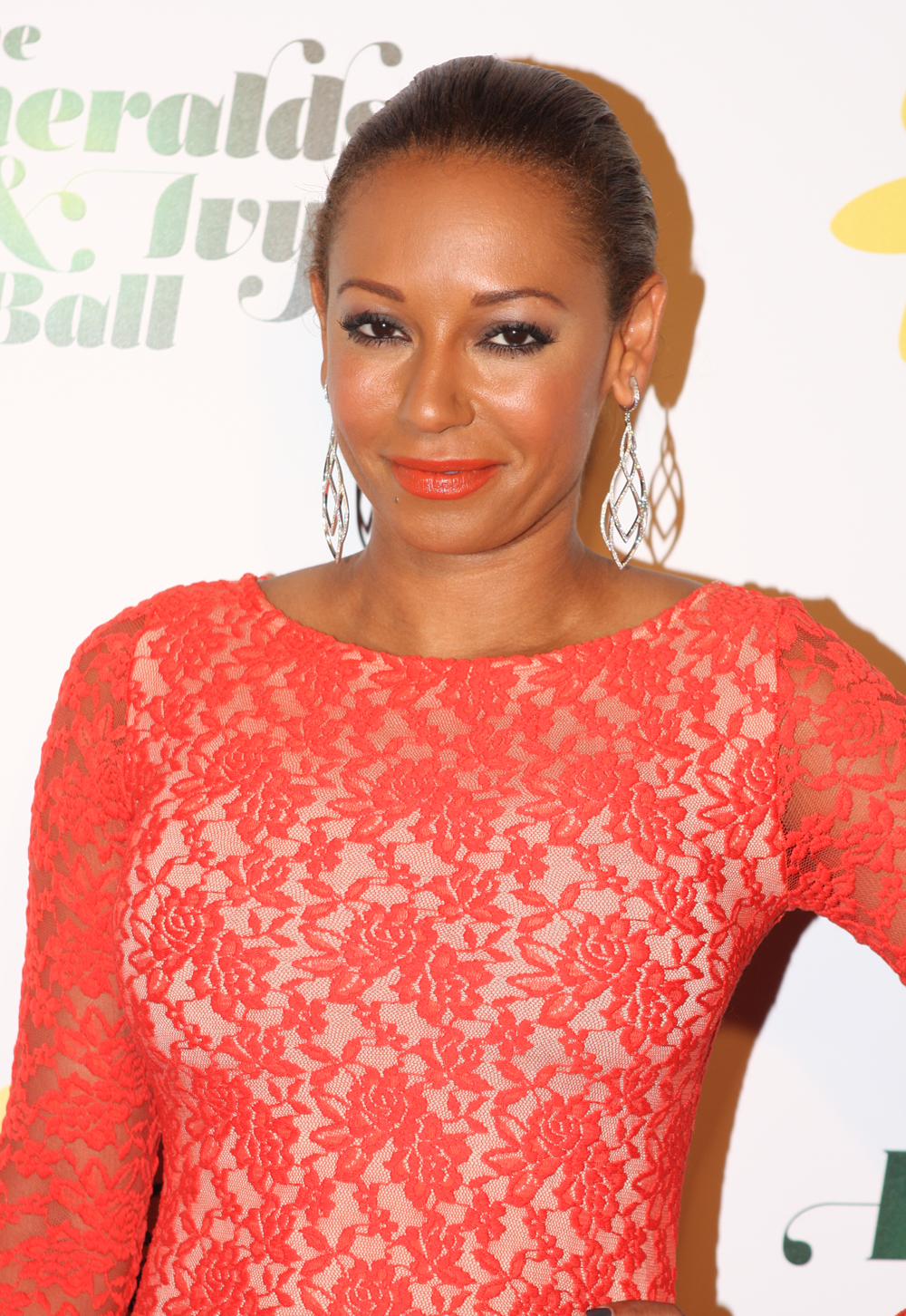
Mel B

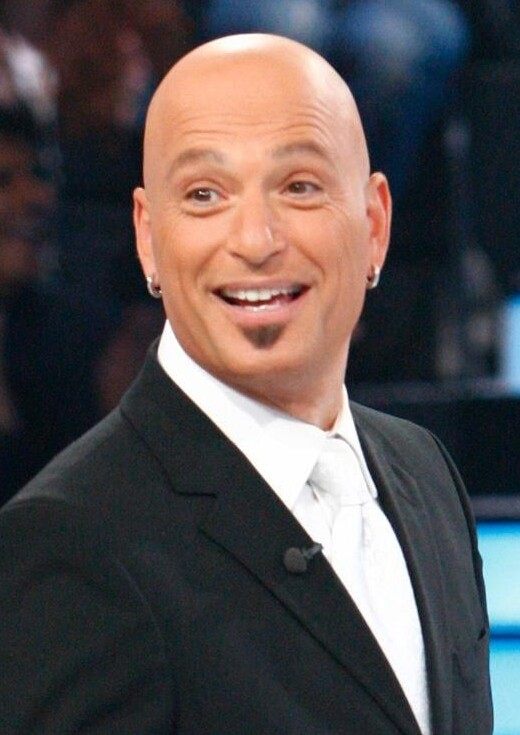
Howie Mandel

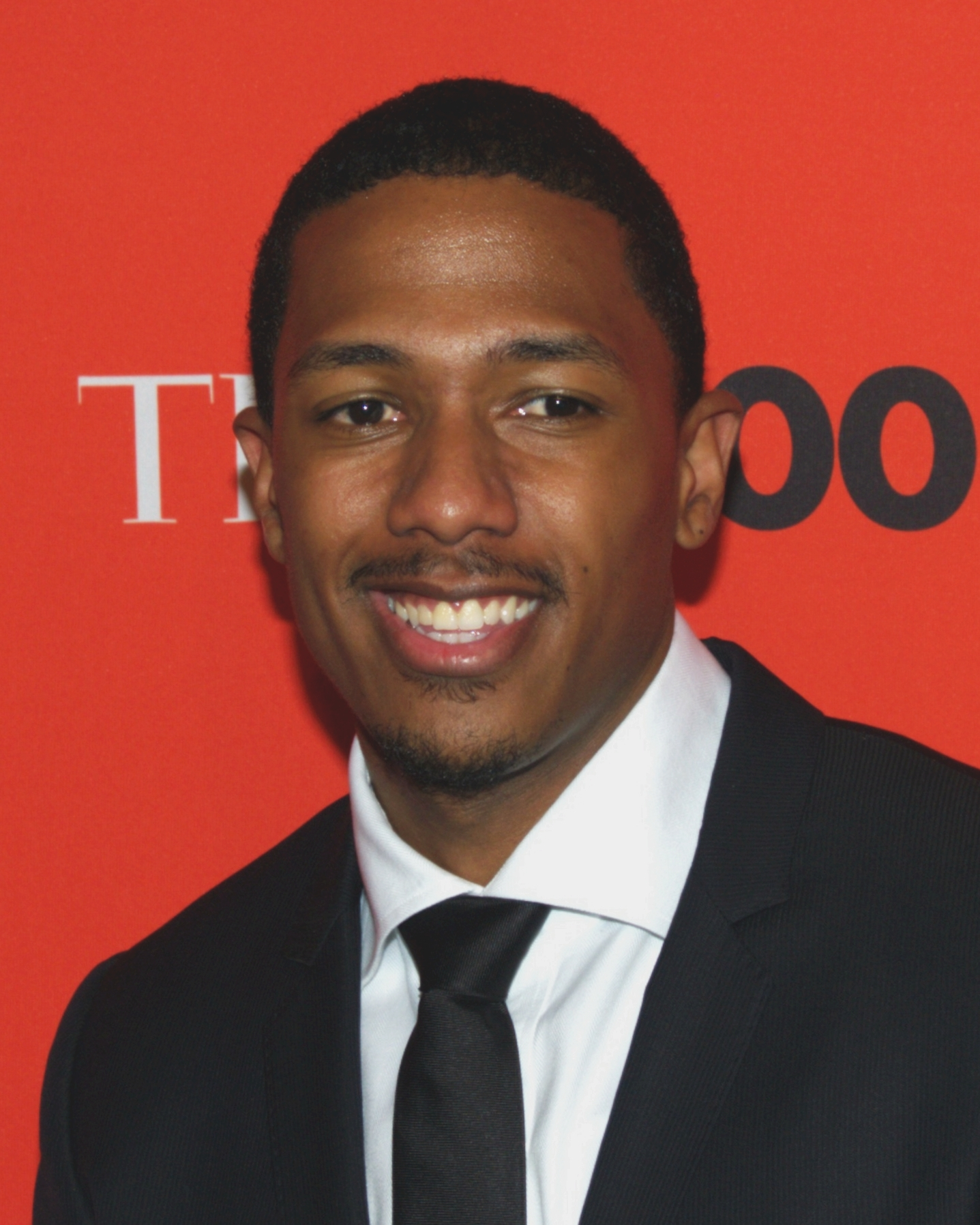
Nick Cannon

The ninth season of American talent show competition series America's Got Talent was broadcast on NBC from May 27 to September 17, 2014. Following the previous season, the program underwent a number of format changes, including the second audition stage and to the Wildcard format. The most significant change to be made was the inclusion of the "Golden Buzzer", an element that was being introduced into the Got Talent franchise around that time (although the format used would later be changed by the next season). Apart from the format changes, the ninth season's audition process featured the first and only involvement of a third-party television program to collaborate with America's Got Talent in offering a place in the competition.

The ninth season was won by magician Mat Franco, with singer Emily West finishing in second, and acrobatic group Acro Army placing third. During its broadcast, the season averaged around over 10.23 million viewers.

== Season overview ==
Auditions for the ninth season's competition took place during 2013 between October and December in Miami, Atlanta, Baltimore, Denver, Houston, Indianapolis, Los Angeles, New York City, and Providence, Rhode Island. Contestants could also submit a video of their audition online. The judges' auditions had a number of sessions held across three major venues the following year in 2014, the first within February at the New Jersey Performing Arts Center in Newark, while the other two took place in April within Madison Square Garden in New York City and the Dolby Theatre in Los Angeles.

Production on the season had a number of changes made. One of the most significant was the introduction of the "Golden Buzzer" format, a new addition that was brought into other editions of the Got Talent franchise. While the format was assigned to the auditions round, it functioned differently in its first use. Anyone who received the buzzer would simply gain a place in the next stage of auditions automatically, although only the judges could use it. In effect, the new buzzer was used mainly to save an act from elimination or to break up a 2–2 tie vote by judges in the auditions. Later seasons would alter the rules for the Golden Buzzer to match that of other international editions.

Another change was to incorporate an online public vote in the live rounds, named after the program's sponsor at the time, which allowed viewers to grant an automatic place in the finals to a semi-finalist in each semi-final. While they could vote via Google, they could only vote on those placed 5th, 6th and 7th in the main public vote respectively, with the remaining two who lost out facing a vote from the judges for advancement. Although the format remained for later seasons, with a different name following a change in sponsor, the ninth season is the only one in the program's history to allow this format to be used in the finals as well. Other changes that were made included a reduction in the number of quarter-finalists and quarter-finals, and the second stage of auditions being conducted in New York, rather than in Las Vegas. It retained the same format of "Vegas Verdicts", but was made more competitive and renamed as "Judgement Week". It was also originally intended to have a live audience, but this idea was later dropped.

One prominent element of the ninth season that was unusual for America's Got Talent, a decision that would not be repeated in later seasons, was to involve another television show. With the collaborative help from The Today Show, a place in the competition's live round was offered to an additional participant. The involvement of a third-party television program in the competition's audition process focused on a simple arrangement. Participants wanting a place in the competition could submit a recording of their performance on the website for The Today Show. The top three entries from these would then conduct a further performance in late July 2014 on the program, and the best of these voted for by the program's viewers would earn a place in the live rounds of the competition.

Forty-eight of the participants who auditioned for this season secured a place in the live quarter-finals, with twelve quarter-finalists performing in each show. About twenty quarter-finalists advanced and were split between the two semi-finals (including four Wildcard acts selected by the judges), with twelve semi-finalists securing a place in the finals, and six finalists securing a place in the grand-final. These are the results of each participant's overall performance during the season:

Winner | Runner-up | Third place | Finalist
Semi-finalist | Quarter-finalist | Wildcard Semi-finalist

Participant	Age(s) ^{1}	Genre	Act	Quarter-Final	Result
AcroArmy	11-27	Acrobatics	Acrobatic Group	3	Third place
ACTE II	29 & 32	Singing	Opera Duo	2	Eliminated
Adrian Romoff	9	Music	Pianist	3	Eliminated
Aerial Animation	33	Acrobatics	Aerialist	2	Semi-finalist
Andrey Moraru	26	Acrobatics	Hand Balancer	2	Semi-finalist
Anna Clendening	20	Singing / Music	Singer & Guitarist	3	Eliminated
Bad Boys of Ballet	— ^{2}	Dance	Dance Group	4	Semi-finalist
Baila Conmigo	— ^{2}	Dance	Dance Group	1	Semi-finalist
Blue Journey	18 & 33	Dance	Dance Duo	3	Finalist
Christian Stoinev	22 ^{3}	Acrobatics / Animals	Hand Balancer	3	Finalist
Cornell Bhangra	18-23	Dance	Dance Group	3	Eliminated
Dan Naturman	44	Comedy	Comedian	1	Semi-finalist
Darik Santos	26	Comedy	Comedian	2	Eliminated
David & Leeman	27 & 29	Magic	Magicians	1	Finalist
Dom the Bom's Triple Threat	8	Variety	Card Throwing Trio	4	Eliminated
Dragon House "The Agents"	23-25	Dance	Dance Trio	3	Eliminated
Emil & Dariel	13 & 16	Music	Cellist Duo	4	Finalist
Emily West	32	Singing	Singer	1	Runner-up
Extreme Dance Company	— ^{2}	Dance	Dance Group	4	Eliminated
Flight Crew Jump Rope	19-29	Variety	Jump Rope Group	1	Semi-finalist
Hart Dance Team	14-17	Dance	Dance Group	2	Eliminated
Jasmine Flowers	12-18	Dance	Dance Group	1	Eliminated
Jaycob Curlee	18	Singing / Music	Singer & Guitarist	2	Semi-finalist
JD Anderson	26	Variety	Strongman	1	Eliminated
John & Andrew	21 & 41	Dance	Salsa Duo	2	Eliminated
Jonah Smith	38	Singing / Music	Singer & Pianist	4	Semi-finalist
Jonatan Riquelme	37	Acrobatics	Balancing Acrobat	4	Eliminated
Juan Carlos	49	Dance	Rollerblade Dancer	2	Eliminated
Julia Goodwin	15	Singing	Singer	1	Eliminated
Kelli Glover	31	Singing	Singer	4	Semi-finalist
Kieran & Finian Makepeace	27 & 31	Singing / Music	Band	3	Eliminated
Livy, Matt & Sammy	18-21	Singing / Music	Band	2	Eliminated
Loop Rawlins	28	Variety	Wild West Performer	2	Eliminated
Mara Justine	11	Singing	Singer	2	Finalist
Mat Franco	25	Magic	Magician	2	Winner
Miguel Dakota	21	Singing / Music	Singer & Guitarist	1	Grand-finalist
Mike Super	37	Magic	Mentalist	3	Finalist
Mothmen Dance	18-35	Dance	Dance Group	4	Eliminated
Nina Burri	36	Acrobatics	Contortionist	4	Eliminated
One Voice Children's Choir	6-18	Singing	Choir	4	Eliminated
Paul Ieti	21	Singing	Singer	3	Semi-finalist
Quintavious Johnson	12	Singing	Singer	4	Grand-finalist
Sean & Luke	17 & 18	Dance	Tap Dance Duo	1	Eliminated
Smoothini	33	Magic	Magician	4	Semi-finalist
Sons of Serendip	26-30	Singing / Music	Band	3	Grand-finalist
The Willis Clan	3-21	Singing / Music	Family Band	1	Eliminated
Valo & Bobby	31 & 37	Acrobatics	Acrobatic Duo	1	Eliminated
Wendy Liebman	53	Comedy	Comedian	3	Semi-finalist

- ^1 Ages denoted for a participant(s), pertain to their final performance for this season.
- ^2 The ages of these participants were not disclosed on the program.
- ^3 The age of the dog in this act was not disclosed on the program.

=== Quarter-finals summary ===
Buzzed Out | Judges' choice | Advanced to Semi-finals
Won Judges' Vote | Lost Judges' Vote

==== Quarter-final 1 (July 29) ====
Guest Performers, Results Show: The Rockettes, Enrique Iglesias and Sean Paul

Quarter-Finalist	Order	Buzzes and Judges' votes				Result (July 30)
Quarter-Finalist	Order	Mandel	Mel B	Klum	Stern	Result (July 30)
Sean & Luke	1					Eliminated
Valo & Bobby	2					Eliminated
Julia Goodwin	3					Eliminated
Baila Conmigo	4					Advanced (Won Judges' Vote)
David & Leeman	5					Advanced
The Willis Clan	6					Eliminated
Flight Crew Jump Rope ^{4}	7					Eliminated (Lost Judges' Vote)
Jasmine Flowers	8					Eliminated
Emily West	9					Advanced
JD Anderson	10					Eliminated
Dan Naturman	11					Advanced
Miguel Dakota	12					Advanced

- ^4 Flight Crew Jump Rope were later appointed as Heidi Klum's Wildcard semi-finalist.

==== Quarter-final 2 (August 5) ====
Guest Performers, Results Show: Lindsey Stirling, and Lzzy Hale

Quarter-Finalist	Order	Buzzes and Judges' votes				Result (August 6)
Quarter-Finalist	Order	Mandel	Mel B	Klum	Stern	Result (August 6)
Hart Dance Team	1					Eliminated
Loop Rawlins	2					Eliminated
John & Andrew	3					Eliminated
Livy, Matt & Sammy	4					Eliminated
Andrey Moraru	5					Advanced
Juan Carlos	6					Eliminated
Mara Justine	7					Advanced (Won Judges' Vote)
Aerial Animation	8					Advanced
Jaycob Curlee	9					Advanced
Mat Franco	10					Advanced
Darik Santos	11					Eliminated
Acte II	12					Eliminated (Lost Judges' Vote)

==== Quarter-final 3 (August 12) ====
Guest Performers, Results Show: Kenichi Ebina, and Taylor Williamson

Quarter-Finalist	Order	Buzzes and Judges' votes				Result (August 13)
Quarter-Finalist	Order	Mandel	Mel B	Klum	Stern	Result (August 13)
Dragon House "The Agents"	1					Eliminated
Anna Clendening	2					Eliminated
Cornell Bhangra	3					Eliminated
Kieran & Finian Makepeace	4					Eliminated
Mike Super ^{5}	5					Eliminated (Lost Judges' Vote)
Adrian Romoff	6					Eliminated
AcroArmy	7					Advanced (Won Judges' Vote)
Wendy Liebman	8					Eliminated
Sons of Serendip	9					Advanced
Blue Journey	10					Advanced
Christian Stoinev	11					Advanced
Paul Ieti	12					Advanced

- ^5 Mike Super was later appointed as Howie Mandel's Wildcard semi-finalist.
- ^6 Wendy Liebman was later appointed Howard Stern's Wildcard semi-finalist.

==== Quarter-final 4 (August 19) ====
Guest Performers, Results Show: Taylor Williamson, and The Illusionists

Quarter-Finalist	Order	Buzzes and Judges' votes				Result (August 20)
Quarter-Finalist	Order	Mandel	Mel B	Klum	Stern	Result (August 20)
Bad Boys of Ballet ^{7}	1					Eliminated
One Voice Children's Choir	2			^{8}		Eliminated (Lost Judges' Vote)
Jonah Smith	3					Advanced
Dom the Bom's Triple Threat	4					Eliminated
Extreme Dance Company	5					Eliminated
Emil & Dariel	6					Advanced
Nina Burri	7					Eliminated
Quintavious Johnson	8					Advanced
Mothmen Dance	9					Eliminated
Smoothini	10					Advanced
Jonatan Riquelme	11					Eliminated
Kelli Glover	12					Advanced (Won Judges' Vote)

- ^7 Bad Boys of Ballet were later appointed as Mel B's Wildcard semi-finalist.
- ^8 Due to the majority vote for Kelli Glover, Klum's voting intention was not revealed.

=== Semi-finals summary ===
Buzzed Out | Judges' choice | Advanced to Finals
Won Online Public Vote | Won Judges' Vote | Lost Judges' Vote

==== Semi-final 1 (August 26) ====
Guest Performer, Results Show: Ariana Grande

Semi-Finalist	Order	Buzzes and Judges' votes				Result (August 27)
Semi-Finalist	Order	Mandel	Mel B	Klum	Stern	Result (August 27)
Flight Crew Jump Rope	1					Eliminated
Mara Justine	2					Advanced (Online Public Vote)
Bad Boys of Ballet	3					Eliminated
Paul Ieti	4					Eliminated
Mike Super	5					Advanced
Andrey Moraru	6					Eliminated
Miguel Dakota	7					Advanced
Sons of Serendip	8					Advanced
David & Leeman	9					Advanced (Won Judges' Vote)
Dan Naturman	10					Eliminated
Aerial Animation	11					Eliminated (Lost Judges' Vote)
Emily West	12					Advanced

- ^9 Due to the majority vote for David & Leeman, Mel B's voting intention was not revealed.

==== Semi-final 2 (September 2) ====
Guest Performers, Results: Maroon 5

Semi-Finalist	Order	Buzzes and Judges' votes				Result (September 3)
Semi-Finalist	Order	Mandel	Mel B	Klum	Stern	Result (September 3)
Jonah Smith	1					Eliminated
Baila Conmigo	2					Eliminated
Jaycob Curlee	3					Eliminated
Mat Franco	4					Advanced
AcroArmy	5					Advanced
Kelli Glover	6					Eliminated
Wendy Liebman	7					Eliminated
Blue Journey	8					Advanced (Online Public Vote)
Emil & Dariel	9					Advanced
Smoothini	10					Eliminated (Lost Judges' Vote)
Christian Stoinev	11					Advanced (Won Judges' Vote)
Quintavious Johnson	12					Advanced

=== Finals summary ===
==== Finals – Top 12 (September 9–10) ====
Guest Performers, Results Show: The Muppets, and Jackie Evancho

Buzzed Out | Judges' choice | Advanced to Grand-final
Won Online Public Vote | Won Judges' Vote | Lost Judges' Vote

Finalist	Order	Buzzes and Judges' votes				Result (September 10)
Finalist	Order	Mandel	Mel B	Klum	Stern	Result (September 10)
Mara Justine	1					Eliminated
David & Leeman	2					Eliminated
Sons of Serendip	3					Advanced (Online Public Vote)
Christian Stoinev	4					Eliminated
Emil & Dariel	5					Eliminated (Judges' Vote Tied – Lost by Public Vote)
AcroArmy	6					Advanced
Quintavious Johnson	7					Advanced
Mike Super	8					Eliminated
Blue Journey	9					Eliminated
Emily West	10					Advanced
Mat Franco	11					Advanced
Miguel Dakota	12					Advanced (Judges' Vote Tied – Won by Public Vote)

==== Grand-Final (September 16) ====
Guest Performers, Results Show: Pitbull & The Rockettes, and Ed Sheeran

Winner | Runner-up | 3rd place

Grand-finalist	Performed with (2nd Performance)	Result (September 17)
AcroArmy	Travis Barker	3rd
Emily West	Cyndi Lauper	2nd
Mat Franco	Rosie O'Donnell	1st
Miguel Dakota	Lenny Kravitz	6th
Quintavious Johnson	Jennifer Hudson	5th
Sons of Serendip	Train	4th

== Ratings ==
The following ratings are based upon those published by Nielsen Media Research after this season's broadcast:

Show	Episode	First air date	Rating (18–49)	Share (18–49)	Viewers (millions)	Time slot rank	Nightly rank	Weekly rank
1	Season premiere	May 27, 2014	3.0	9	12.00	1	1	1
2	Auditions Week 2	June 3, 2014	2.9	10	11.30	1	1	3
3	Auditions Week 3	June 10, 2014	2.6	9	11.54	1	2	5
4	Auditions Week 4	June 17, 2014	2.6	9	11.42	1	1	1
5	Auditions Week 5	June 22, 2014	2.1	6	8.12	1	1	2
6	Auditions Week 6	July 1, 2014	2.6	9	11.14	1	1	1
7	Best of Auditions	July 15, 2014	2.0	7	8.53	2	2	5
8	Judgment Week 1	July 22, 2014	2.4	8	10.43	1	1	1
9	Judgment Week 2	July 23, 2014	2.4	8	10.32	1	1	2
10	Quarterfinals, Week 1 (performances)	July 29, 2014	2.4	8	10.64	1	1	2
11	Quarterfinals, Week 1 (results)	July 30, 2014	2.2	7	10.79	1	2	4
12	Quarterfinals, Week 2 (performances)	August 5, 2014	2.0	6	9.04	1	1	4
13	Quarterfinals, Week 2 (results)	August 6, 2014	2.0	7	10.12	1	2	3
14	Quarterfinals, Week 3 (performances)	August 12, 2014	2.1	6	9.68	1	1	3
15	Quarterfinals, Week 3 (results)	August 13, 2014	1.9	6	9.97	1	2	6
16	Quarterfinals, Week 4 (performances)	August 19, 2014	2.0	7	9.48	1	1	5
17	Quarterfinals, Week 4 (results)	August 20, 2014	1.9	6	9.43	1	2	7
18	Semifinals, Round 1 (performances)	August 26, 2014	2.1	7	9.52	1	1	3
19	Semifinals, Round 1 (results)	August 27, 2014	1.8	6	9.46	1	2	8
20	Semifinals, Round 2 (performances)	September 2, 2014	1.8	6	8.99	1	1	14
21	Semifinals, Round 2 (results)	September 3, 2014	2.0	6	10.47	1	2	10
22	Top 12 (performances)	September 9, 2014	1.9	6	9.83	1	2	8
23	Top 12 (results)	September 10, 2014	1.8	6	10.52	1	2	10
24	Finals (performances)	September 16, 2014	2.5	8	11.46	1	1	6
25	Finale	September 17, 2014	2.4	8	12.21	1	1	8

Recap episodes

Show	Episode	First air date	Rating (18–49)	Share (18–49)	Viewers (millions)	Time slot rank	Nightly rank	Weekly rank
1	Quarterfinals Week 1, Recap	July 30, 2014	1.2	5	6.29	2	3	16
2	Quarterfinals Week 2, Recap	August 6, 2014	1.1	4	6.06	2	4	18
3	Quarterfinals Week 3, Recap	August 13, 2014	1.1	4	5.84	2	5	20
4	Quarterfinals Week 4, Recap	August 20, 2014	1.1	4	5.68	2	5	20
5	Semifinals Week 1, Recap	August 27, 2014	1.0	4	5.55	3	7	21
6	Semifinals Week 2, Recap	September 3, 2014	1.1	4	6.42	3	5	n/a ^{a}
7	Top 12, Recap	September 10, 2014	1.2	4	6.90	3	5	24

- ^a This episode's weekly rank is not known because it was not among the 25 highest ranked shows of the week.
