= Sons of Serendip =

Musical group

SONS OF SERENDIP
- Also known as: S.O.S.
- Origin: America's Got Talent (group); Boston, U.S. (Christian); Charlotte, North Carolina, U.S. (Ramseur); Atlanta, U.S. (Morton); Charlotte, North Carolina, U.S. (Rodriguez)
- Genres: Classical crossover
- Years active: 2014–present
- Label: Independent
- Members: Kendall Ramseur (cellist); Cordaro Rodriguez (pianist); Mason Morton (harpist); Micah Christian (lead vocalist)
- Website: sonsofserendip.com

Sons of Serendip is a classical crossover ensemble consisting of musicians Kendall Ramseur (cellist), Cordaro Rodriguez (pianist), Mason Morton (harpist), and Micah Christian (lead vocalist). The quartet met in graduate school at Boston University, while completing degrees in Cello Performance (Ramseur), Law (Rodriguez), Harp Performance (Morton), and Theology (Christian). A year after finishing their graduate education, the group formed in 2014 specifically for the reality competition, America's Got Talent (season 9), where they finished in fourth place.

== America's Got Talent ==
=== Overview ===
Sons of Serendip gained national attention in 2014 when they appeared on the 9th season of America's Got Talent. Celebrity judges Howie Mandel, Mel B, Heidi Klum, and Howard Stern voted them through the audition round and Judgement Week, and into the Quarterfinals. During the live performance rounds, viewers voted the quartet through several rounds and into the Top 6 (Finals). During the finale, which aired on September 17, 2014, they performed their arrangement of "Drops of Jupiter" with Train. They placed fourth in the competition.

=== Performances/results ===
Week	Location	Song choice	Original artist	Result
Audition	New York (Madison Square Garden)	"Somewhere Only We Know"	Keane	Advanced
Judgement Week	New York	"I Can't Make You Love Me"	Bonnie Raitt	Advanced
Quarterfinals	Radio City Music Hall	"Wicked Game"	Chris Isaak	Advanced
Semifinals	Radio City Music Hall	"Don't You Worry Child"	Swedish House Mafia	Advanced
Top 12	Radio City Music Hall	"Ordinary World"	Duran Duran	Advanced (Snapple Save)
Top 6	Radio City Music Hall	"Somewhere Only We Know (reprise)" "Bring Me To Life"	Keane; Evanescence	N/A
Finale; Duets	Radio City Music Hall	"Drops of Jupiter"	Train	4th Place

=== America's Got Talent Holiday Spectacular ===
In December 2016, Sons of Serendip joined a cast of America's Got Talent alumni for the first ever America's Got Talent Holiday Spectacular. They performed "The Christmas Song" in collaboration with the Silhouettes (the runner-up from season 6).

=== America's Got Talent: The Champions ===
In 2019, Sons of Serendip was one of 50 acts selected from the global Got Talent franchise to compete in the first season of America's Got Talent: The Champions. The season premiered on January 7, 2019, on NBC. On February 4, 2019, the quartet performed "Somewhere Only We Know," and finished in the top three for the episode.

== Live performances ==
Following the finale of season 9 of America's Got Talent, Sons of Serendip performed for America's Got Talent Live, alongside season 9 winner, Mat Franco, and other selected finalists, at Planet Hollywood's Axis Theater. They also made an appearance on Fox & Friends' Christmas, joining Andy Grammer, Jackie Evancho, Scotty McCreery, Jessie James Decker, and Renée Fleming. The quartet has since toured nationally, performing at concert halls and performing arts centers, including Boston's Symphony Hall, The Dolby Theatre in Los Angeles, California, and the Atlanta Symphony Hall in Atlanta, Georgia,

Sons of Serendip has been featured guests at several charitable and private events, including Oprah Winfrey's 2020 Vision Tour closing party, Hank Aaron's Chasing the Dream Foundation, Inc., the Ron Burton Humanitarian Award Dinner, and One Family's 15th anniversary gala, where they opened for John Legend. Further, in 2016, the quartet performed for the In Memoriam segment for the Creative Arts Emmy Awards at the Microsoft Theater in Los Angeles, California. Their performance aired on September 17, 2016, on FXX. Later that year, they were featured artists for the Nantucket Project's annual conference. They also performed the national anthem at the New York Knicks home opener for the organization's 75th anniversary.

== Orchestra collaborations ==
Sons of Serendip has collaborated with a number of orchestras, oftentimes performing orchestrations written, arranged, and notated by pianist, Cordaro Rodriguez, and cellist, Kendall Ramseur. In May 2015, they collaborated with the Boston Pops and guest conductor John Morris Russell at Boston's Symphony Hall. Later that year, they were invited to perform with Keith Lockhart and the Boston Pops for the Boston Fourth of July Extravaganza in 2015. The quartet also performed with conductor, Steven Karidoyanes, and the Plymouth Philharmonic Orchestra at the historic Memorial Hall in Plymouth, Massachusetts. Further, in May 2017, they reunited with conductor John Morris Russell and collaborated with the Cincinnati Symphony Orchestra and broadway performer, Cynthia Erivo, for the annual Classical Roots concert in Cincinnati, Ohio.

== Albums ==
In January 2015, they released their self-titled debut album, which placed in several categories on the Billboard Charts, including No. 4 on Heatseekers. Recordings from their debut album have been placed in various episodes of reality competitions America's Got Talent, The X Factor UK, and The Four following its release. Their second album, Christmas: Beyond the Lights, was released in October 2015 and also charted on the Billboard Charts. On July 14, 2017, they released their third album entitled, Life + Love.
