= Speak My Mind =

Speak My Mind may refer to:

- "Speak My Mind", a song by Drake Bell from A Reminder (2011)
- Speak My Mind, a 2018 album by The Willis Clan, as well as the title track
