= Emily West =

American music artist (born 1981)

- Born: Emily Marie Nemmers; July 9, 1981 (age 44)
- Origin: Waterloo, Iowa, United States
- Genres: Country
- Occupation: Singer-songwriter
- Instrument: Vocals
- Years active: 2007–present
- Labels: Capitol Nashville; Sony Masterworks

Emily Marie Nemmers (born July 9, 1981) is an American music artist, who performs and records under the name Emily West. Signed to Capitol Records Nashville, she debuted on Billboard's Hot Country Songs charts in early 2008 with the single "Rocks in Your Shoes". This song peaked at No. 39 early in the year, and is the first single from a self-titled EP. She entered the country charts a second time with "Blue Sky", a duet with Keith Urban, in 2010.

In 2012, West guest-starred in Body of Proof. In 2014, she competed on the 9th season of America's Got Talent, where she finished as the runner up to magician Mat Franco. Since her success on the show, West has toured extensively throughout the United States, first with her one-woman show and then with America's Got Talent Live: The All-Stars Tour!

== Early life ==
West, the youngest of four children, was born in Waterloo, Iowa. In July 1994 her parents took her to Bird-On-Fire Recording Studio in West Union, Iowa where studio owner Doug Koempel worked with her producing four demos: "Sweet Dreams", "Piece Of My Heart", "Higher Love" and "Me And Bobby McGee." She moved to Nashville, Tennessee in 2000 following her graduation from Waterloo West High School in hopes of achieving her goals of becoming a country music singer. West soon signed a deal with a publishing company in Nashville, Warner-Chapell. West was then signed to Capitol Records Nashville when producer Mike Dungan listened to her demo tapes. One of her first appearances was as a background vocalist on Chely Wright's 2005 album The Metropolitan Hotel.

== Career ==
=== 2007–2012: Music and television ===
Capitol released a self-titled EP December 11, 2007, to the iTunes music store. In early 2008, West was featured in People magazine and completed a media tour for her debut single, "Rocks in Your Shoes". "Rocks in Your Shoes" peaked in the Top 40 on the Billboard Hot Country Songs chart in early 2008. A second single, "That Kind of Happy" was released in April 2009 and failed to enter the chart.

West appeared on Are You Smarter Than a 5th Grader? on September 25, 2009, winning $25,000. In January 2010, West released a duet with labelmate Keith Urban titled "Blue Sky." The song debuted at No. 53 on the Hot Country Songs chart for the week of February 23, 2010. Roughstock gave the song 4½ stars out of 5, stating that "'Blue Sky' is already a contender for one of 2010's best singles." It spent thirteen weeks on the charts and peaked at No. 38.

Emily appeared in the April 18, 2010, episode of Celebrity Apprentice, as the "music make-over" target for the women's team led by Cyndi Lauper. Lauper won the challenge and as a result West donated 100% of the first month of iTunes sales of her song "Blue Sky" to the Stonewall Community Foundation, Lauper's charity.

She appeared in the January 10, 2012 "Shades of Blue" episode on Body of Proof on ABC. She played a drug addict trying to make it in the music business. She sings her single "Head On" at the end of the episode: Season 2 episode 12 in "Body of Proof." She shows herself to be a terrific actress & singer.

=== 2014–present: America's Got Talent ===
In 2014, West competed on the 9th season of America's Got Talent, advancing to the finals. She finished in second place.

Shortly after the show ended, West signed a record deal with Sony Masterworks, and released a two-track single on December 2, 2014;

On April 6, 2015, the first single, called "Bitter", off her upcoming album "All For You" was released, and the album was released in August 2015.

==== Performances and results ====
| Episode | Theme | Song choice | Original artist | Order | Result |
|---|---|---|---|---|---|
| Audition | Auditioner's Choice | "Sea of Love" | Phil Phillips | N/A | Advanced |
| Judgement Week | N/A | "You Got It" | Roy Orbison | N/A | Advanced |
| Top 48 | Quarter-finals | "Chandelier" | Sia | 9 | Advanced |
| Top 24 | Semi-finals, Part 1 | "Who Wants to Live Forever" | Queen | 12 | Advanced |
| Top 12 | Top 12 | "Nights in White Satin" | The Moody Blues | 10 | Advanced |
| Finals | Breakthrough Performance; Brand New Choice | "Chandelier" "The First Time Ever I Saw Your Face" | Sia; Roberta Flack | 3; 12 | Runner-up |

== Discography ==
=== Studio albums ===
| Title | Album details | Peak chart positions | |
| Title | Album details | US | US Heat |
|---|---|---|---|
| All for You | Release date: August 14, 2015; Label: Portrait Records | 188 | 2 |

=== Extended plays ===
| Title | Album details | Peak chart positions | | | |
| Title | Album details | US Country | US Heat | US Indie | US Folk |
|---|---|---|---|---|---|
| Emily West | Release date: December 11, 2007; Label: Capitol Nashville | — | — | — | — |
| I Hate You, I Love You | Release date: December 29, 2011; Label: Emily West | 41 | 9 | 41 | 7 |
| Rocket Science | Release date: June 24, 2014; Label: Yellow Brick Road Records | — | — | — | — |
"—" denotes releases that did not chart

=== Singles ===
| Year | Single | Peak chart positions | | | Album |
| Year | Single | US Country | US Bubbling | CAN | Album |
|---|---|---|---|---|---|
| 2008 | "Rocks in Your Shoes" | 39 | — | — | Emily West (EP) |
| 2009 | "That Kind of Happy" | — | — | — | —N/a |
| 2010 | "Blue Sky" (with Keith Urban) | 38 | 4 | 97 | —N/a |
| 2012 | "Cross My Heart" | — | — | — | GCB: Music from Season One |
| 2014 | "Made for the Radio" | — | — | — | —N/a |
| 2014 | "Wonderful Things" | — | — | — | —N/a |
| 2014 | "Chandelier" | — | — | — | All for You |
| 2014 | "Santa Baby" | — | — | — | —N/a |
"—" denotes releases that did not chart

=== Music videos ===
| Year | Video | Director |
|---|---|---|
| 2008 | "Rocks in Your Shoes" (road video) | |
| 2008 | "Rocks in Your Shoes" | Stephen Shepherd |
| 2009 | "O Holy Night" | Stephen Shepherd |
| 2010 | "Blue Sky" | Stephen Shepherd |
| 2014 | "Chandelier" | |
| 2015 | "Bitter" | |
| 2017 | "Symphonies" | |
| 2017 | "Don't Ever Go To Paris When You're Lonely" | |
