= Taylor Williamson =

American stand-up comic

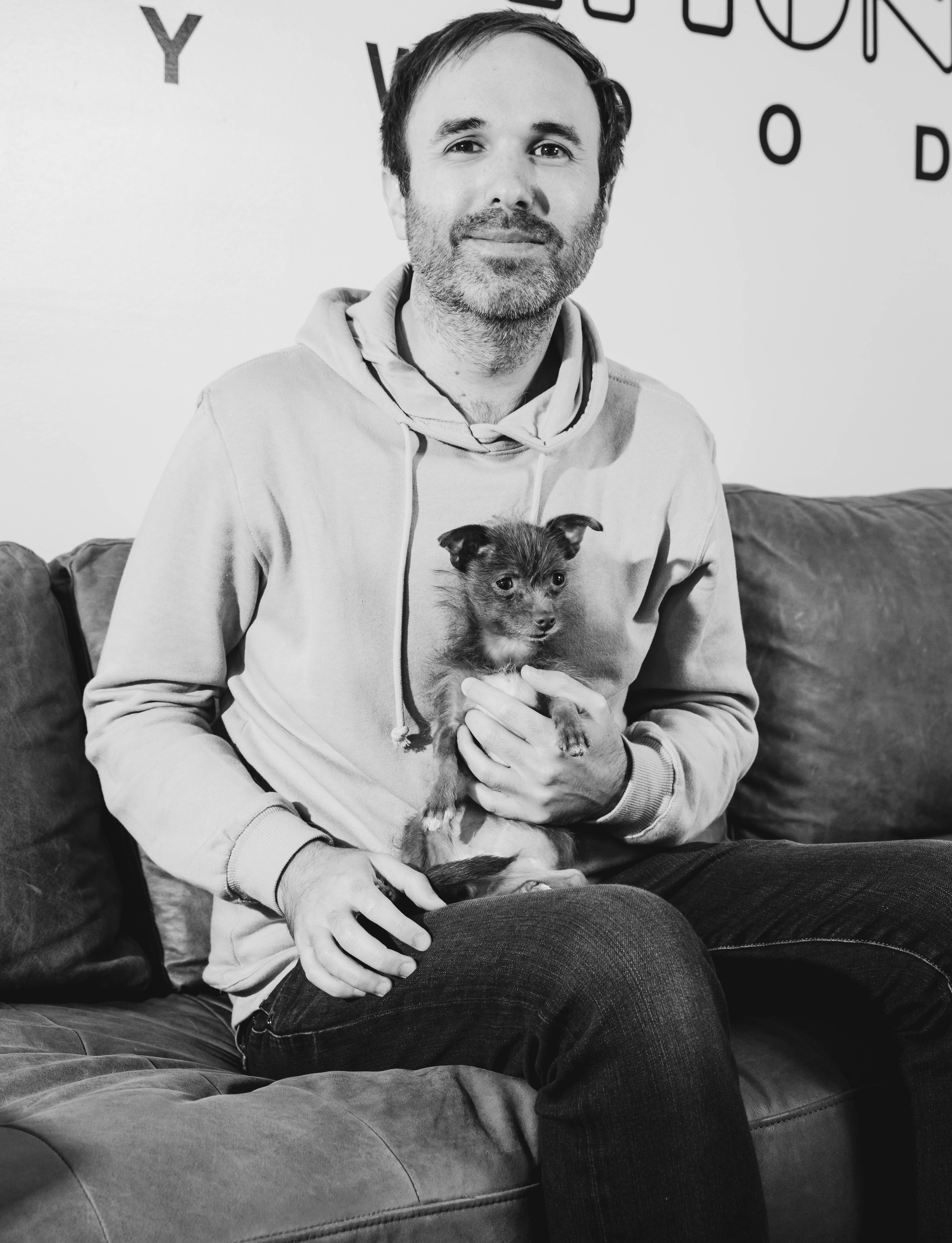
Taylor with his dog

Taylor Williamson is an American stand-up comic. He is known for finishing as the runner-up on the eighth season of America's Got Talent and as a semi-finalist on Last Comic Standing.

== Career ==
Williamson started his stand-up career at the age of 17 while a student at Torrey Pines High School in San Diego. Because he was under the age of 21 when he started performing, he would be told to wait outside the comedy club upon completing his set, preventing him from watching other comics. Earlier in his career, he also performed at venues such as coffee houses, pizza parlors, and cafeterias.

Williamson's performance trademarks include a dry, awkward stage persona and self-deprecating humor. He has listed comics such as Zach Galifianakis, Greg Giraldo, and Jim Gaffigan as some of his early influences. His notable appearances have included the Just for Laughs comedy festival, Live at Gotham, Total Request Live, and The Late Late Show with Craig Ferguson, where he was the youngest comic to ever appear on the show.

=== Last Comic Standing ===
In 2010, Williamson was a contestant on the seventh season of Last Comic Standing, where he was eliminated by the judges in the semifinals.

=== America's Got Talent ===
Following a successful preliminary audition in Los Angeles, Williamson was unanimously selected for the Vegas round by the show's four judges. A favorite of Howie Mandel and Howard Stern, he advanced through each round, relying on a save by judges' choice in the quarterfinals. During his run to the finals, he also coined the term "Taylords", affectionately referring to the members of his growing fanbase. In the season finale, Williamson was announced as the competition's runner-up, finishing second in votes behind Kenichi Ebina. He has since vacillated between expressing dismay at the finale result and appreciation for his experience on the show.

Taylor returned to the show as a guest in Season 9 (appearing on both the August 13 and 20 shows), and Season 16 (appearing on the September 15 season finale).

In the tenth anniversary special of the show, Taylor was named judge Heidi Klum's all-time favorite act.

He later returned to and participated in America's Got Talent: The Champions in 2019, but didn't receive enough votes to advance to the finals.

== Discography ==
- Laughter? I Hardly Know Her! (2012)
