= Red Panda (acrobat) =

Chinese American acrobat (born 1970/71)

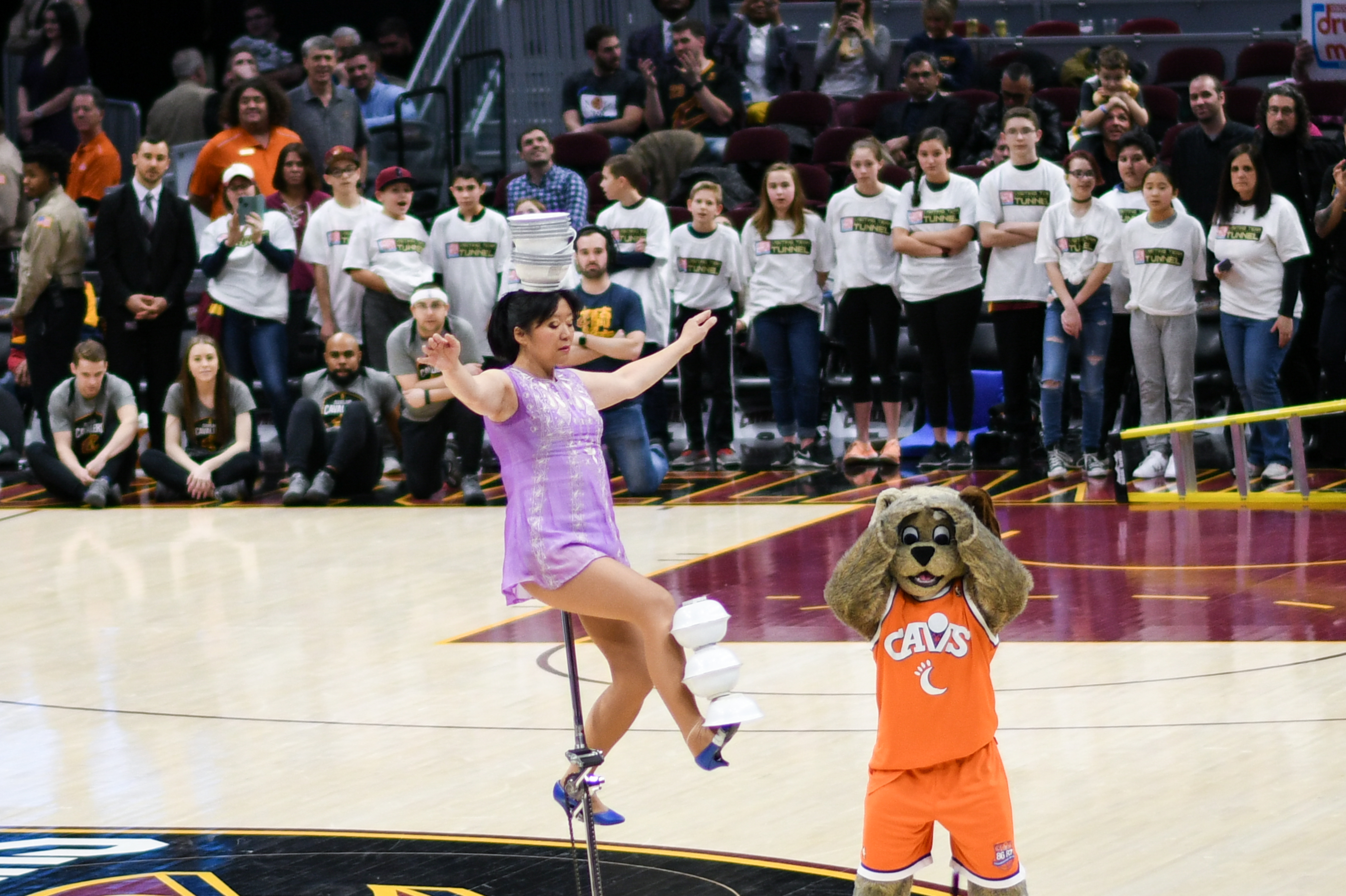
- Red Panda performing at 2018 Cleveland Cavaliers game
- Born: Rong Niu; 1970 or 1971 (age 55–56); Taiyuan, Shanxi, China
- Occupation: Acrobat

Rong "Krystal" Niu (born 1970 or 1971) is a Chinese American acrobat who performs under the stage name Red Panda named after the animal with the same name. Her act involves riding an 8-foot (2.4 m) tall unicycle while catching and balancing multiple metal bowls on her feet and head. She is known for her performances during halftime shows of National Basketball Association (NBA) games. She also appeared in season 8 of America's Got Talent, series 18 of Britain's Got Talent, and Live with Kelly and Mark.

== Early life ==
Niu was born and raised in Taiyuan in Shanxi, China. Her parents, GuiZhang Niu and Jiang LongDi, were both acrobats. Rong Niu is a fourth-generation acrobat, with her mother, grandmother and great grandmother having flipped bowls as well. She began practicing her act at age 7 under the tutelage of her father, and later attended a boarding school for the acrobatic arts. She also toured internationally with the Shanghai Acrobatic Troupe from age 14 to 19.

She moved to the United States when she was 19, first to Orlando, Florida, and later to the Sunset District neighborhood of San Francisco, California, where she has since lived.

== Career ==
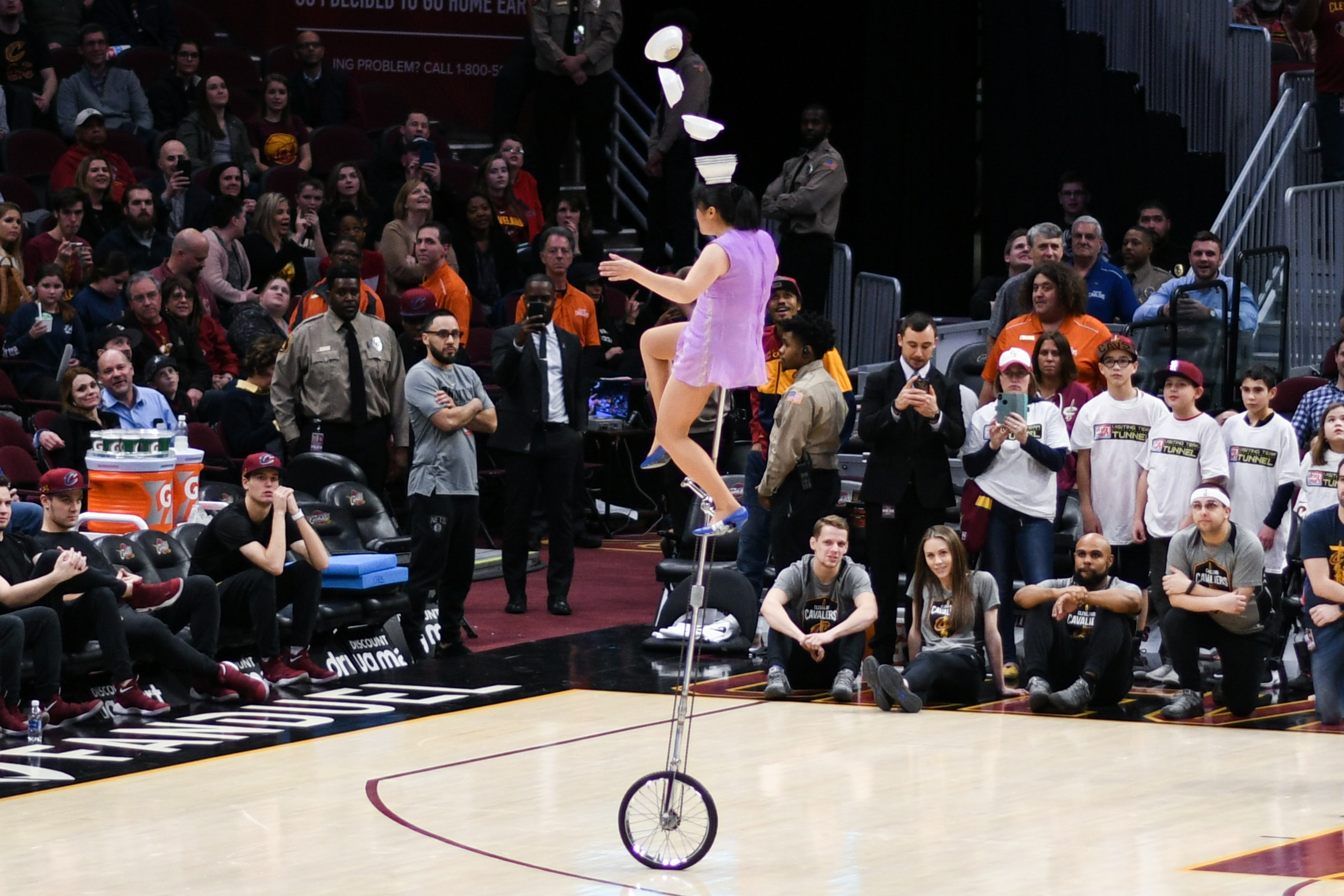
Red Panda in 2018

After moving to the United States, Niu sent audition tapes to various circuses and venues. On Thanksgiving 1993, she received an invitation to perform at a home game for the Los Angeles Clippers, who needed a last-minute replacement for a canceled act. In the subsequent season, she performed during halftime of over 40 NBA games. She has since regularly performed at NBA games, developing a cult following among fans and sports-writers. She has also frequently performed during halftime shows of college basketball games. Dime called her "the best halftime act in basketball".

In 2013, she appeared in season 8 of America's Got Talent and earned a place as a quarter-finalist, but left the show for personal reasons when her father was diagnosed with cancer. She stopped performing to care for him. Still practicing while caring for her father, Niu fell backwards off her unicycle and broke her wrist. It was her first major injury as an acrobat. Her father died in 2014. Afterwards, her mother suffered health issues. Niu returned to performing at NBA games in 2015, performing at the Memphis Grizzlies' 2015–16 home opener on October 28.

Her performance lasts about 5 1/2 minutes, and includes sixteen metal bowls painted white. She estimates she has a perfect show 75–80 per cent of the time. During her hiatus in 2014, Darren Rovell reported that she made $5,000 per performance at her peak.

In January 2018, her custom-built unicycle was stolen from the baggage claim at San Francisco International Airport. She temporarily used a makeshift unicycle made from old and broken parts. After hearing about the theft, the Golden State Warriors paid to replace the unicycle.

She appeared on Britain's Got Talent series 18 in 2025 and reached the semifinals. Niu also made an appearance as a halftime performer for the fictional basketball team Los Angeles Waves in the 2025 comedy series Running Point.

On July 1, 2025, Niu was injured while performing at the 2025 WNBA Commissioner's Cup championship game. During her halftime performance, she fell from her unicycle, fracturing her left wrist. According to Niu's agent, the fall was caused by a faulty left pedal that was damaged while in transit. She returned in October, performing on Amazon Prime in a postgame performance after its Thursday Night Football game.

== Personal life ==
Niu became a U.S. citizen in 1997.
