= America's Got Talent season 8 =

America's Got Talent
- Season 8
- Showrunner: Jason Raff
- Hosted by: Nick Cannon
- Judges: Howard Stern; Heidi Klum; Mel B; Howie Mandel
- Winner: Kenichi Ebina
- Runner-up: Taylor Williamson
- Finals venue: Radio City Music Hall
- No. of episodes: 35

Release
- Original network: NBC
- Original release: June 4 – September 18, 2013

Season chronology
- ← Previous; Season 7 Next → Season 9

Judges and Host for America's Got Talent Season 8

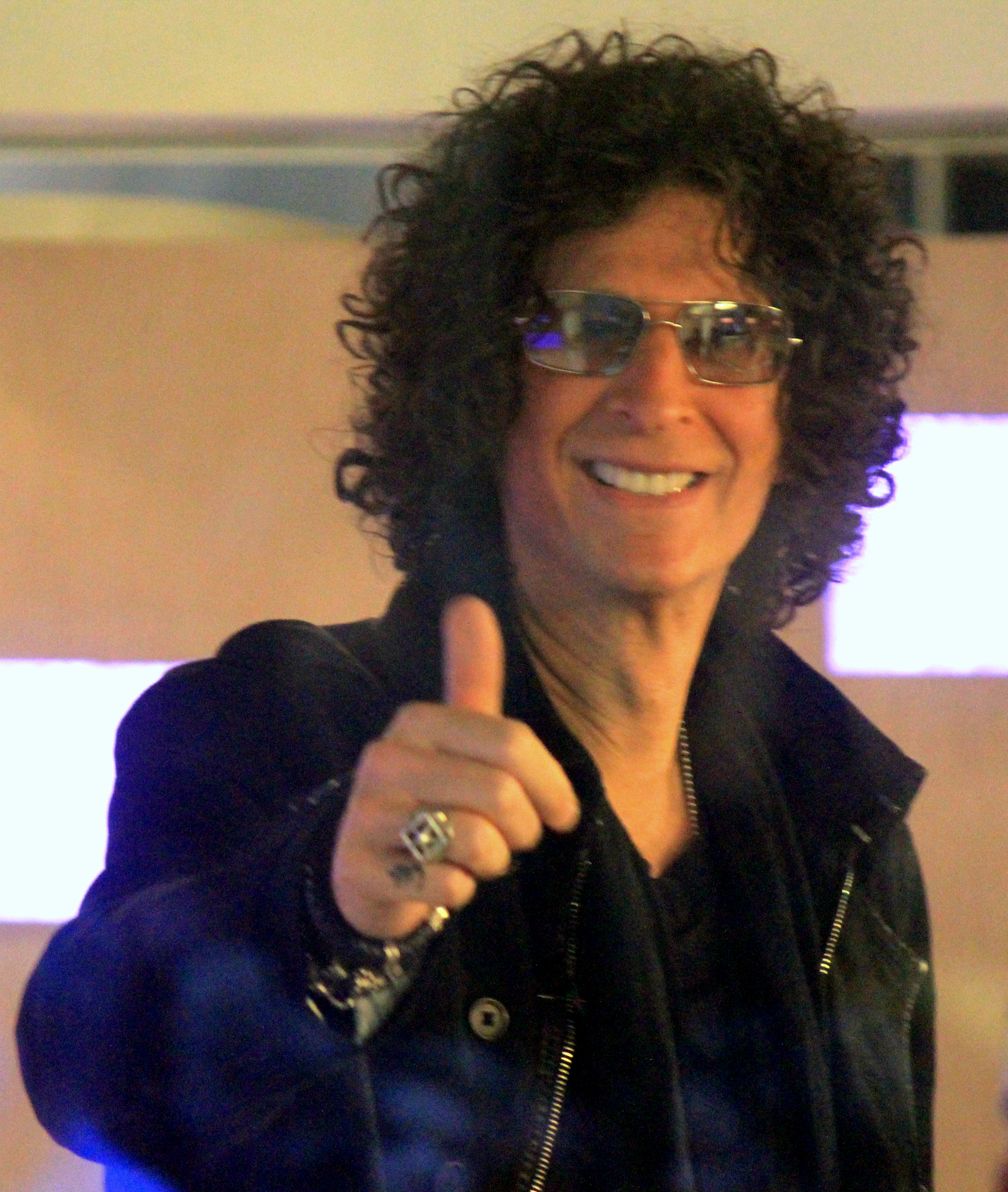
Howard Stern

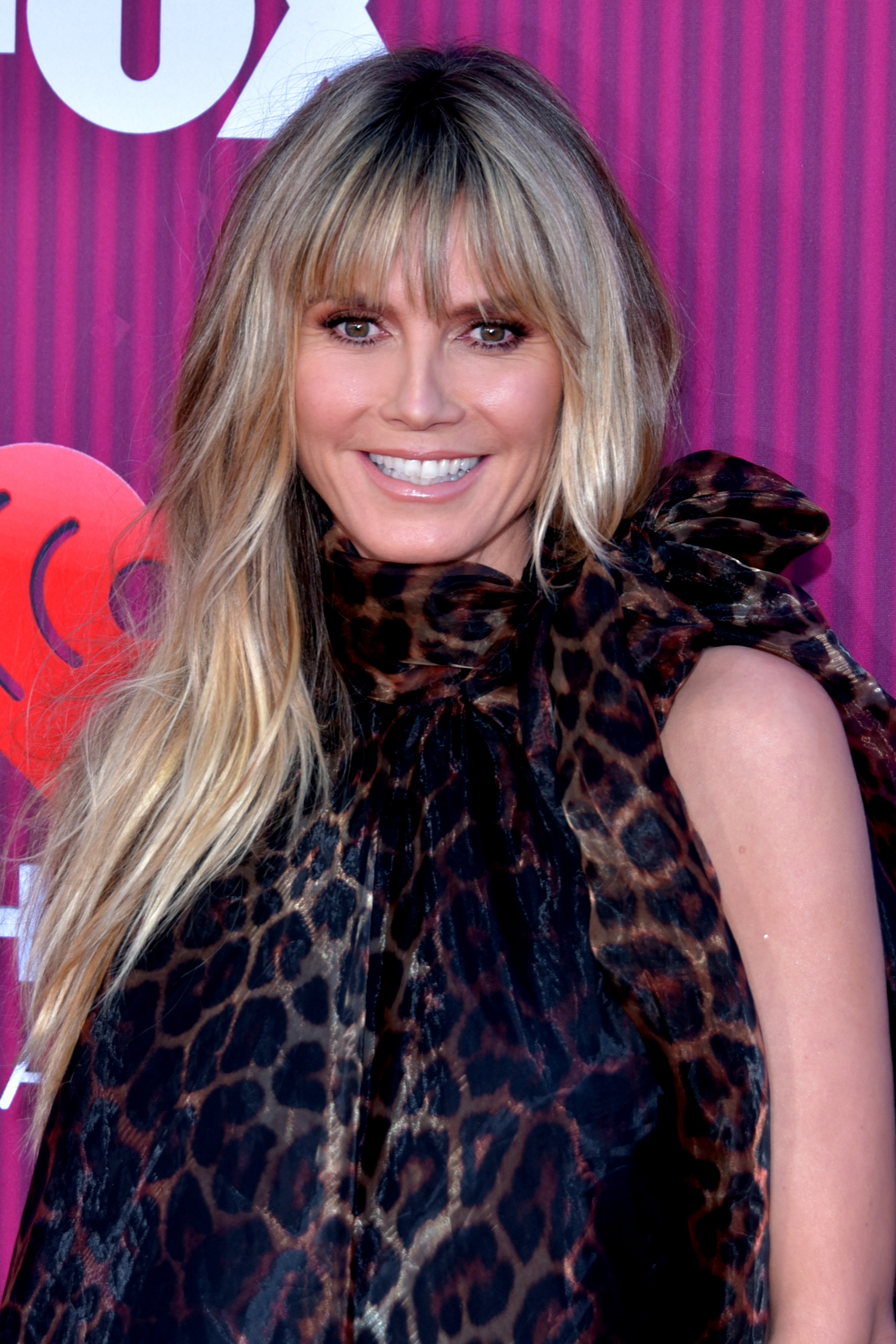
Heidi Klum

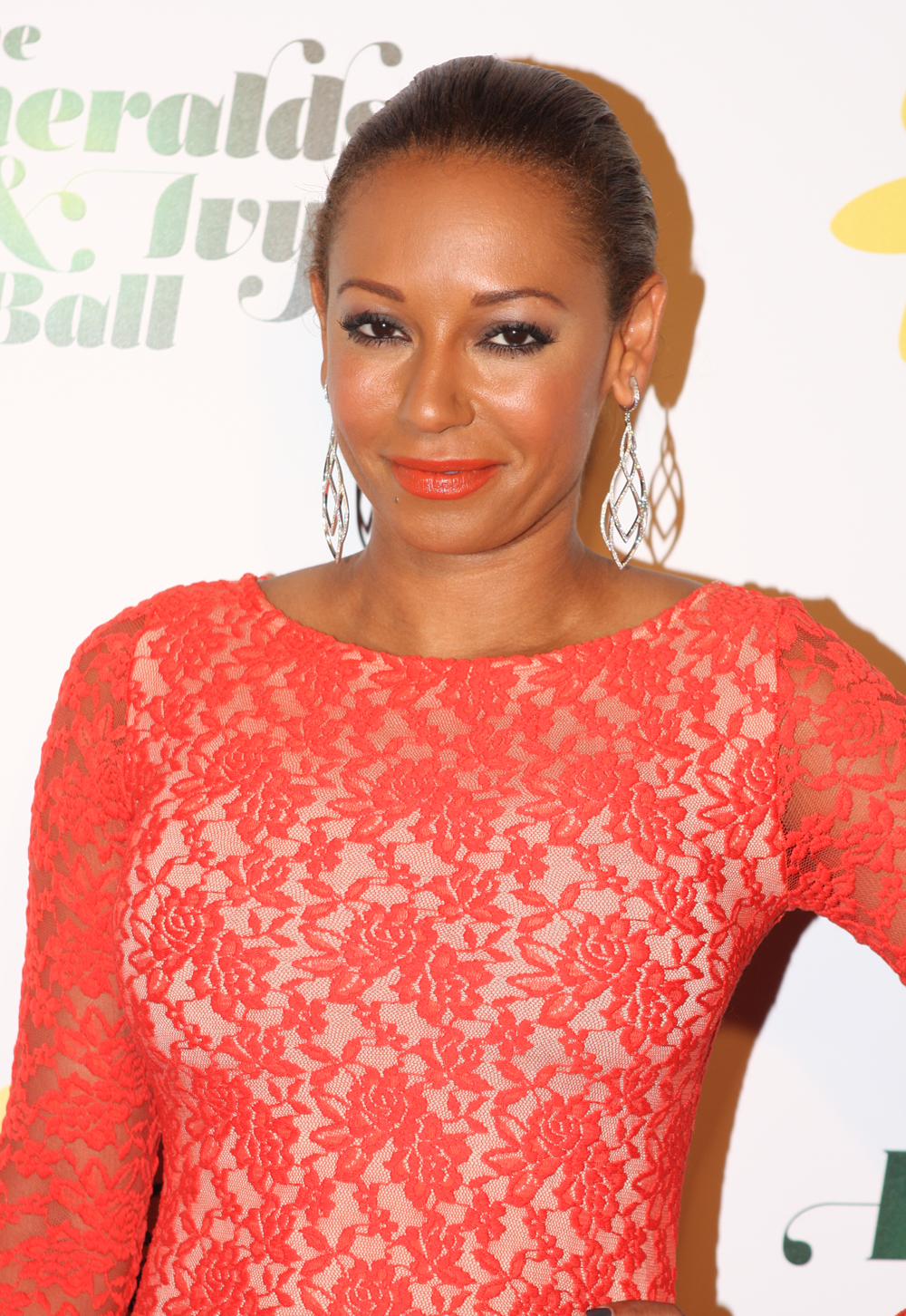
Mel B

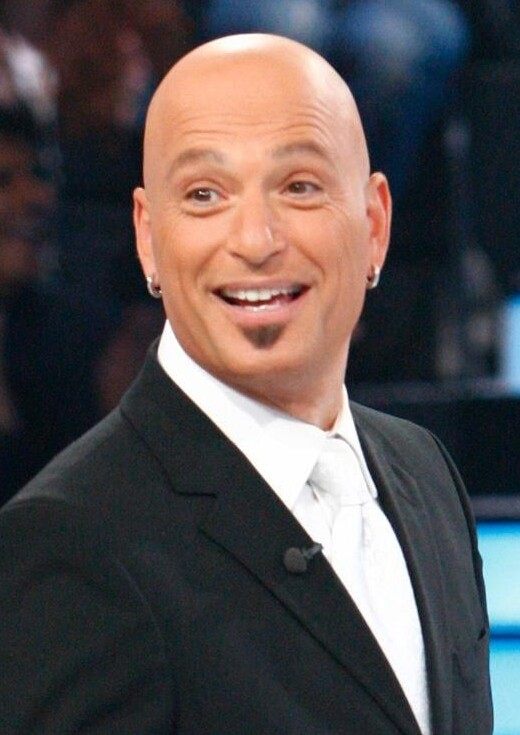
Howie Mandel

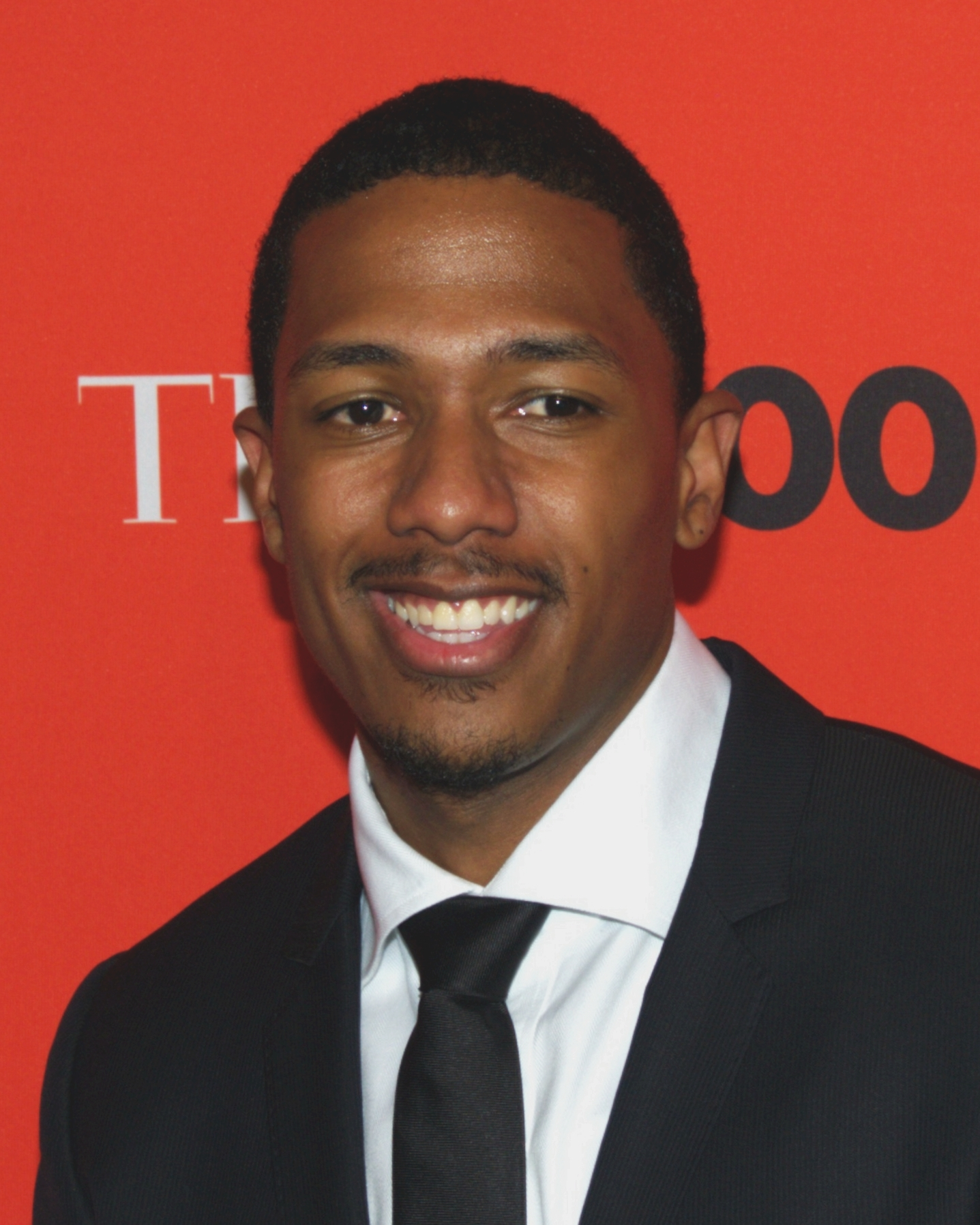
Nick Cannon

The eighth season of American talent show competition series America's Got Talent was broadcast on NBC from June 4 to September 18, 2013. Following the previous season, Sharon Osbourne left the program following a dispute with the network, leading to Mel B replacing her. The judging panel was expanded with Heidi Klum serving as a fourth judge. Along with these changes, the live rounds for this season were moved to Radio City Music Hall in New York.

The eighth season was won by mime dancer Kenichi Ebina, the first foreign act to win the American competition. Stand-up comedian Taylor Williamson finished in second, with singer and guitarist Jimmy Rose placing third. During its broadcast, the season averaged around over 10.10 million viewers.

== Season overview ==
Auditions for the eighth season's competition took place between January and May 2013, in a far wider number of venues. Open auditions were held between January and February in Seattle, Portland (Oregon), Birmingham (Alabama), Memphis, Nashville, Savannah, Raleigh, Norfolk and Columbus. New Orleans, San Antonio, New York City, Los Angeles and Chicago also held open auditions (along with judges' auditions from March to May). Prior to production beginning, Sharon Osbourne became involved in a dispute with NBC, following the conclusion of the seventh season. Due to the treatment of her son in another of the network's programs, the dispute fundamentally culminated in her departing from the show.

Initially, executive producer Simon Cowell had wanted Carmen Electra to replace Osbourne on the program, but the decision was made to find someone else and expand the judging panel to incorporate four judges. This format change was first introduced on the sixth season of Britain's Got Talent. Singer Mel B was revealed as Osbourne's replacement, which was announced on February 20, 2013. On March 3, supermodel Heidi Klum was revealed as the fourth judge. During filming, Howie Mandel was absent on the first day of auditions in Los Angeles for personal reasons.

Following the previous season, some changes were made for the live rounds. After moving to the New Jersey Performing Arts Center in season seven to accommodate new judge Howard Stern, it was announced that the live shows would be presented from Radio City Music Hall in New York City. Both the YouTube and Wildcard quarter-finals were dropped from the schedule, and replaced with a standard fifth quarter-final round, with the Wildcard format adjusted. Judges could only select one eliminated quarter-finalist each as their Wildcard act, but their choice would be granted an automatic place in the semi-finals as a result. Additionally, any participant who reached the grand-final stage of the competition would be required to conduct two different performances, although the second routine would be done with a guest performer to accompany the style of their act. For example, a singer's second performance would have the potential of involving another singer to sing a duet with them.

Of the participants who auditioned for this season, sixty secured a place in the live quarter-finals, with twelve quarter-finalists in each one. About twenty of these advanced and were split between the two semi-finals, including three quarter-finalists chosen as Wildcard acts, along with the last-minute addition that had previously withdrew before the live rounds. Twelve semi-finalists secured a place in the finals, and six finalists secured a place in the grand-final. The following below lists the results of each participant's overall performance in this season:

Winner | Runner-up | Third place | Finalist
Semi-finalist | Quarter-finalist | Wildcard Semi-finalist

Participant	Genre	Act	Quarter-Final	Result
2Unique	Music	Rapper and DJ	5	Eliminated
3Penny Chorus & Orchestra	Music	Orchestra	4	Eliminated
Aaralyn & Izzy	Singing / Music	Singer and Drummer	1	Eliminated
Aerial Ice	Acrobatics	Ice Skating Group	4	Eliminated
AeroSphere Aerial Balloon Show	Acrobatics	Aerialist	3	Eliminated
Alexandr Magala	Danger	Sword Swallower	2	Eliminated
Alexandria the Great	Danger	Escape Artist	1	Eliminated
American Hitmen	Music	Band	1	Eliminated
American Military Spouses Choir	Singing	Choir	3	Semi-finalist
Angela Hoover	Comedy	Impressionist	2	Semi-finalist
Anna Christine	Singing	Singer	1	Semi-finalist
Aquanuts	Variety	Synchronized Swimmers	2	Eliminated
Brad Byers	Danger	Sideshow Performer	2	Eliminated
Branden James	Singing	Opera Singer	1	Finalist
Brandon & Savannah	Music	Band	3	Eliminated
Cami Bradley	Singing / Music	Singer	4	Grand-finalist
Catapult Entertainment	Dance	Shadow Dance Group	5	Finalist
Champions Forever	Variety	Unicycle Group	4	Eliminated
Chicago Boyz	Acrobatics	Acrobatic Group	3	Finalist
Chloe Channell	Singing	Singer	4	Eliminated
Ciana Pelekai	Singing	Singer	2	Eliminated
Collins Key	Magic	Magician	1	Grand-finalist
D'Angelo & Amanda	Dance	Ballroom Duo	5	Finalist
Dave Fenley	Singing / Music	Singer & Guitarist	5	Semi-finalist
Dave Shirley	Comedy	Comedian	2	Eliminated
David "The Cobra Kid" Weathers	Animals	Snake Handler	3	Eliminated
David Ferman	Variety	Juggler	4	Eliminated
Deanna DellaCioppa	Singing	Singer	3	Eliminated
Duo Resonance	Acrobatics	Acrobat Duo	5	Eliminated
Forte	Singing	Opera Trio	2	Grand-finalist
Fresh Faces	Dance	Dance Group	1	Eliminated
Hype	Dance	Dance Group	1	Eliminated
Innovative Force	Acrobatics	Acrobatic Group	2	Finalist
Jim Meskimen	Comedy	Impressionist	3	Eliminated
Jimmy Rose	Singing / Music	Singer & Guitarist	4	Third place
John Wing	Comedy	Comedian	5	Semi-finalist
Jonathan Allen	Singing	Opera Singer	3	Semi-finalist
Kelsey and Bailey	Animals	Dog Act	3	Eliminated
Kenichi Ebina	Dance	Dancer	3	Winner
Kevin Downey Jr.	Comedy	Comedian	1	Eliminated
Kid the Wiz	Dance	Dancer	2	Eliminated
KriStef Brothers	Acrobatics	Acrobatic Duo	1	Finalist
Leon Etienne & Romy Low	Magic	Magicians	3	Semi-finalist
Marty Brown	Singing / Music	Singer & Guitarist	2	Semi-finalist
Melody Caballero ^{1}	Acrobatics	Contortionist	5	Eliminated
Mitsi Dancing School	Dance	Dance Group	3	Eliminated
Red Panda	Acrobatics	Acrobat	—N/a ^{1}	Semi-finalist
Ruby & Jonas	Dance	Ballroom Duo	5	Eliminated
Sam Johnson	Danger	Daredevil	5	Eliminated
Selena Mykenzie Gordon	Singing	Singer	5	Eliminated
SensEtion	Dance	Dance Group	4	Eliminated
Special Head	Variety	Novelty Act	1	Eliminated
Sprice	Variety	Kinetic Artist	5	Eliminated
Struck Boyz	Dance	Dance Group	2	Eliminated
Taylor Williamson	Comedy	Comedian	4	Runner-up
Tellavision	Dance	Dance Group	1	Eliminated
The Robotix	Music	Band	4	Eliminated
Timber Brown	Acrobatics	Acrobat	4	Semi-finalist
Tone the Chiefrocca	Singing	Rapper	2	Semi-finalist
Tummy Talk	Music	Body Drummers	4	Eliminated
Virginia State University Gospel Chorale	Singing	Gospel Choir	5	Eliminated

- ^1 Red Panda originally had a place in the quarter-finals, but were forced to withdraw for personal reasons. While they later returned as a WildCard semi-finalist, their quarter-final place was given to Melody Caballero as a direct result.

=== Quarter-finals summary ===
Buzzed Out | Judges' choice | Advanced to Semi-finals
Won Judges' Vote | Lost Judges' Vote

==== Quarter-final 1 (July 23) ====
Guest Performers, Results Show: The Rockettes, Labrinth, and Emeli Sandé

Quarter-Finalist	Order	Buzzes and Judges' votes				Result (July 24)
Quarter-Finalist	Order	Mandel	Mel B	Klum	Stern	Result (July 24)
Anna Christine	1					Advanced (Judges' Vote Tied - Won by Public Vote)
tellAvision	2					Eliminated
American Hitmen	3					Eliminated (Judges' Vote Tied - Lost by Public Vote)
Special Head	4					Eliminated
Fresh Faces	5					Eliminated
Collins Key	6					Advanced
Kevin Downey Jr.	7					Eliminated
Aaralyn and Izzy	8					Eliminated
Alexandria the Great	9					Eliminated
KriStef Brothers	10					Advanced
Hype	11					Eliminated
Branden James	12					Advanced

==== Quarter-final 2 (July 30) ====
Guest Performers, Results Show: Robin Thicke, Brad Paisley

Quarter-Finalist	Order	Buzzes and Judges' votes				Result (July 31)
Quarter-Finalist	Order	Mandel	Mel B	Klum	Stern	Result (July 31)
Innovative Force	1					Advanced
Ciana Pelekai	2					Eliminated
Alexandr Magala	3					Eliminated
Struck Boyz	4					Eliminated
Brad Byers	5					Eliminated
Kid the Wiz	6					Eliminated
Forte	7					Advanced
Angela Hoover	8					Advanced (Judges' Vote Tied - Won by Public Vote)
Dave Shirley	9					Eliminated
Marty Brown	10					Advanced
Aquanuts ^{2}	11					Eliminated
Tone the Chiefrocca ^{3}	12					Eliminated (Tied on Judges' Vote - Lost by Public Vote)

- ^2 Due to the nature of the Aquanuts' performance, their quarter-final routine had to be pre-recorded at another location.
- ^3 Tone the Chiefrocca was later appointed as Mel B's WildCard semi-finalist.

==== Quarter-final 3 (August 6) ====
Guest Performers, Results Show: Marion Ross, and Jason Derulo

Quarter-Finalist	Order	Buzzes and Judges' votes				Result (August 7)
Quarter-Finalist	Order	Mandel	Mel B	Klum	Stern	Result (August 7)
AeroSphere Aerial Balloon Show	1					Eliminated
Chicago Boyz	2			^{4}		Advanced (Won Judges' Vote)
Mitsi Dancing School	3			^{4}		Eliminated (Lost Judges' Vote)
Kelsey and Bailey	4					Eliminated
Brandon & Savannah	5					Eliminated
Leon Etienne & Romy Low ^{5}	6					Eliminated
Deanna DellaCioppa	7					Eliminated
David "The Cobra Kid" Weathers	8					Eliminated
Jonathan Allen	9					Advanced
Kenichi Ebina	10					Advanced
Jim Meskimen	11					Eliminated
American Military Spouses Choir	12					Advanced

- ^4 Due to the majority vote for Chicago Boyz, Klum's voting intention was not revealed.
- ^5 Leon Etienne & Romy Low were later appointed as Howard Stern's WildCard semi-finalist.

==== Quarter-final 4 (August 13) ====
Guest Performers, Results Show: Backstreet Boys

Quarter-Finalist	Order	Buzzes and Judges' votes				Result (August 14)
Quarter-Finalist	Order	Mandel	Mel B	Klum	Stern	Result (August 14)
3Penny Chorus & Orchestra	1					Eliminated
Chloe Channell	2					Eliminated (Judges' Vote Tied - Lost by Public Vote)
Champions Forever	3					Eliminated
SensEtion	4					Eliminated
The Robotix	5					Eliminated
Timber Brown	6					Advanced
Cami Bradley	7					Advanced
Tummy Talk	8					Eliminated
Taylor Williamson	9					Advanced (Judges' Vote Tied - Won by Public Vote)
Aerial Ice	10					Eliminated
David Ferman	11					Eliminated
Jimmy Rose	12					Advanced

==== Quarter-final 5 (August 20) ====
Guest Performers, Results Show: Tom Cotter, Train, and Ashley Monroe

Quarter-Finalist	Order	Buzzes and Judges' votes				Result (August 21)
Quarter-Finalist	Order	Mandel	Mel B	Klum	Stern	Result (August 21)
Virginia State University Gospel Chorale	1					Eliminated
Melody Caballero	2					Eliminated
Dave Fenley	3					Advanced
2Unique	4					Eliminated
Sam Johnson ^{6}	5					Eliminated
Duo Resonance ^{7}	6					Eliminated (Lost Judges' Vote)
D'Angelo & Amanda	7					Advanced
Selena Mykenzie Gordon	8					Eliminated
John Wing	9					Advanced (Won Judges' Vote)
Sprice	10					Eliminated
Ruby & Jonas	11					Eliminated
Catapult Entertainment	12					Advanced

- ^6 For health and safety reasons, Sam Johnson's quarter-final performance had to be pre-recorded at another location.
- ^7 Duo Resonance were later appointed as Heidi Klum's WildCard semi-finalist.

=== Semi-finals summary ===
Buzzed Out | Judges' choice | Advanced to Finals
Won Judges' Vote | Lost Judges' Vote

==== Semi-final 1 (August 27) ====
Guest Performers, Results Show: One Direction, and Cassadee Pope

Semi-Finalist	Order	Buzzes and Judges' votes				Result (August 28)
Semi-Finalist	Order	Mandel	Mel B	Klum	Stern	Result (August 28)
Tone the Chiefrocca	1					Eliminated
Red Panda	2					Eliminated
Angela Hoover	3					Eliminated
Duo Resonance	4					Eliminated
Collins Key	5					Advanced
Innovative Force	6					Advanced
Dave Fenley	7					Eliminated (Lost Judges' Vote)
Taylor Williamson	8					Advanced
Jonathan Allen	9					Eliminated
Catapult Entertainment	10					Advanced (Won Judges' Vote)
Cami Bradley	11					Advanced
Forte	12					Advanced

==== Semi-final 2 (September 3) ====
Guest Performers, Results Show: Fall Out Boy, and Team iLuminate

Semi-Finalist	Order	Buzzes and Judges' votes				Result (September 4)
Semi-Finalist	Order	Mandel	Mel B	Klum	Stern	Result (September 4)
D'Angelo & Amanda	1					Advanced (Judges' Vote Tied - Won by Public Vote)
Marty Brown	2					Eliminated
Chicago Boyz	3					Advanced
Leon Etienne and Romy Low	4					Eliminated
Anna Christine	5					Eliminated (Judges' Vote Tied - Lost by Public Vote)
Kenichi Ebina	6					Advanced
John Wing	7					Eliminated
Branden James	8					Advanced
KriStef Brothers ^{8}	9					Advanced
American Military Spouses Choir	10					Eliminated
Timber Brown	11					Eliminated
Jimmy Rose	12					Advanced

- ^8 Kristef Brothers had to perform in the second semi-final, due to an accident in rehearsals. Red Panda were given their place in the first semi-final, both as a last-minute replacement and as Howie Mandel's WildCard act.

=== Finals summary ===
==== Final - Top 12 (September 10) ====
Guest Performers, Results Show: Terry Fator, and Olate Dogs

Advanced to Grand-Final | Eliminated

Top 12 Finalist	Order	Result (September 11)			
Top 12 Finalist	Order	Result (September 11)	Chicago Boyz	1	Eliminated
Branden James	2	Eliminated			
Innovative Force	3	Eliminated			
KriStef Brothers	4	Eliminated			
D'Angelo & Amanda	5	Eliminated			
Catapult Entertainment	6	Eliminated			
Forte	7	Advanced			
Taylor Williamson	8	Advanced			
Collins Key	9	Advanced			
Kenichi Ebina	10	Advanced			
Jimmy Rose	11	Advanced			
Cami Bradley	12	Advanced			

==== Grand-Final (September 17) ====
Guest Performers, Results Show: The Rockettes, Icona Pop, Earth, Wind & Fire, Luke Bryan

Winner | Runner-up | 3rd place

Grand-finalist	Performed with (2nd Performance)	Result (September 18)
Cami Bradley	Gavin DeGraw	6th
Collins Key	Kathie Lee Gifford and Hoda Kotb	5th
Forte	Josh Groban	4th
Jimmy Rose	Dierks Bentley	3rd
Kenichi Ebina	Il Divo with Heather Headley	1st
Taylor Williamson	James Lipton	2nd

== Ratings ==
The following ratings are based upon those published by Nielsen Media Research after this season's broadcast:

Show	Episode	First air date	Rating (18–49)	Share (18–49)	Viewers (millions)	Time slot rank	Nightly rank	Weekly rank
1	Auditions Episode 1: San Antonio, New York, & Los Angeles	June 4, 2013	3.1	9	11.22	1	1	5
2	Auditions Episode 2: San Antonio & New Orleans	June 11, 2013	3.0	8	11.52	2	2	5
3	Auditions Episode 3: Chicago	June 18, 2013	3.0	9	11.75	1	3	5
4	Auditions Episode 4: New York & Los Angeles	June 25, 2013	2.6	8	10.23	1	1	2
5	Auditions Episode 5: Chicago & San Antonio	July 2, 2013	2.4	7	9.56	1	1	2
6	Auditions Episode 6: Los Angeles, New Orleans, & New York	July 9, 2013	2.6	8	9.81	1	1	3
7	Auditions Episode 7: Last Chance Auditions	July 10, 2013	2.8	8	10.71	1	1	1
8	Vegas Week, day 1	July 16, 2013	2.5	7	10.06	2	2	4
9	Vegas Week, day 2	July 17, 2013	2.9	9	11.18	1	1	2
10	Quarterfinals Week 1, Performances	July 23, 2013	2.8	8	10.34	1	1	1
11	Quarterfinals Week 1, Results	July 24, 2013	2.3	7	10.64	1	1	5
12	Quarterfinals Week 2, Performances	July 30, 2013	2.7	8	9.81	1	1	4
13	Quarterfinals Week 2, Results	July 31, 2013	2.4	7	10.28	1	1	6
14	Quarterfinals Week 3, Performances	August 6, 2013	2.5	7	9.39	1	1	4
15	Quarterfinals Week 3, Results	August 7, 2013	2.5	8	10.26	1	1	3
16	Quarterfinals Week 4, Performances	August 13, 2013	2.4	7	8.79	1	1	1
17	Quarterfinals Week 4, Results	August 14, 2013	2.1	6	9.51	2	2	5
18	Quarterfinals Week 5, Performances	August 20, 2013	2.2	6	8.52	1	1	6
19	Quarterfinals Week 5, Results	August 21, 2013	2.1	6	9.35	2	3	9
20	Semifinals Round 1, Performances	August 27, 2013	2.2	6	8.70	1	1	4
21	Semifinals Round 1, Results	August 28, 2013	2.2	6	9.84	2	2	5
22	Semifinals Round 2, Performances	September 3, 2013	2.3	7	9.16	1	1	12
23	Semifinals Round 2, Results	September 4, 2013	2.3	7	10.03	1	1	13
24	Top 12, Performances	September 10, 2013	2.3	6	9.24	1	1	8
25	Top 12, Results	September 11, 2013	2.2	6	10.80	2	3	13
26	Finals, Performances	September 17, 2013	2.4	7	11.19	2	3	14
27	Finale	September 18, 2013	2.5	7	11.49	1	2	12

Recap Episodes

Show	Episode	First air date	Rating (18–49)	Share (18–49)	Viewers (millions)	Time slot rank	Nightly rank	Weekly rank
1	Auditions Recap	July 17, 2013	1.9	7	7.65	1	2	15
2	Quarterfinals Week 1, Recap	July 24, 2013	1.6	5	6.65	1	2	n/a ^{a}
3	Quarterfinals Week 2, Recap	July 31, 2013	1.5	5	6.54	1	2	n/a ^{a}
4	Quarterfinals Week 3, Recap	August 7, 2013	1.5	5	6.35	2	3	16
5	Quarterfinals Week 4, Recap	August 14, 2013	1.3	5	5.75	2	3	n/a ^{a}
6	Quarterfinals Week 5, Recap	August 21, 2013	1.3	4	5.87	2	3	n/a ^{a}
7	Semifinals Week 1, Recap	August 28, 2013	1.3	5	5.96	2	4	n/a ^{a}
8	Semifinals Week 2, Recap	September 4, 2013	1.4	5	6.16	2	3	n/a ^{a}

- ^a The weekly rank for these episodes is unknown, due to each not being amongst the 25 highest rated shows of their respective week.
