= Steven Karidoyanes =

American conductor

Steven Karidoyanes (born November 5, 1957, Boston, Massachusetts to Michael and Tula Karidoyanes) is an American composer, broadcaster and conductor with the Plymouth Philharmonic Orchestra.

He holds a Bachelor of Music degree from Boston University and received training in orchestral conducting at the Canford School of Music in Dorset, England, where he studied with the British conducting coach, George Hurst.

== Career ==
A member of ASCAP, Karidoyanes is the conductor of the Plymouth Philharmonic Orchestra, a professional orchestra on Boston's historic South Shore, since 1994.

In 2000 he composed Café Neon: Fantasy on Greek Songs and Dances that was performed by the Pittsburgh Symphony Orchestra. Of the piece, which he dedicated to his parents, Karidoyanes writes:

"Café Neon owes its form and existence to the 20th century Hungarian composer, Zoltán Kodály. When I first conducted Kodály's Galánta Dances I was immediately taken by the music's passion and color and wished there was a Greek equivalent which would gratify my Hellenic heritage. Café Neon now fills that personal void."

The original title for this piece was Tavérna, the Greek word for tavern, but it was not inspiring enough for Karidoyanes and the title was changed to Café Neon, an Americanized version of the Greek word Kafeníon, coffee bar.

Since its premiere in November 2000, Café Neon has had dozen of performances by orchestras in Massachusetts, Michigan, Wisconsin, California, Indiana, Italy and Greece. A classical music announcer/producer, Mr. Karidoyanes is a frequent fill-in host for Boston's WGBH Radio, and has worked for NPR (National Public Radio) affiliates in North Carolina and Indiana.

On September 20, 2003, Karidoyanes conducted an All-Mozart program with the Prague Symphony Chamber Orchestra in the Czech Republic's Smetana Hall. On March 13, 2004 he conducted the Massachusetts All-State Senior High School Festival Orchestra in Boston's Symphony Hall. Past guest conductor engagements include the Syracuse Symphony, the Rochester Philharmonic and orchestras throughout the New England and Washington, D.C. regions.

His performances have been called "excellent" (The Boston Globe) and "beautifully controlled" (The Washington Post). He has held the posts of Music Director of the Boston College Symphony Orchestra, Associate Conductor of the Winston-Salem Symphony and Greensboro Symphony orchestras in North Carolina, and Assistant Conductor of the Rhode Island Philharmonic.
