= The Willis Family =

American reality television show

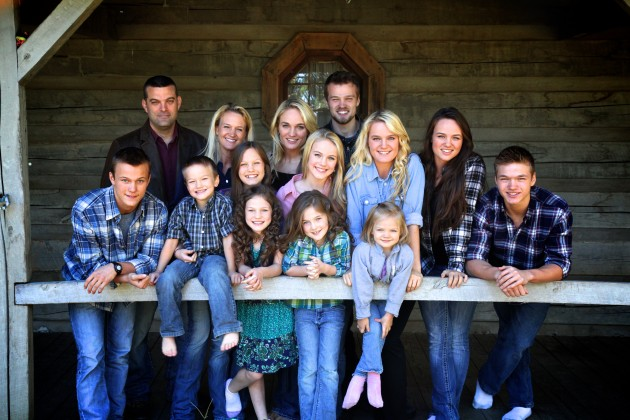
- Genre: Reality television
- Starring: The Willis Family
- Opening theme: "100 Times Better With You"
- Composer: The Willis Clan
- Country of origin: United States
- Original language: English
- No. of seasons: 2
- No. of episodes: 13

Production
- Production location: Nashville, Tennessee
- Camera setup: Multiple
- Production companies: Figure 8 Films; Heart Bridge Media

Original release
- Network: TLC
- Release: May 5, 2015 – April 16, 2016

The Willis Family is an American reality television show about a musical family that aired on TLC in 2015 and 2016. The show follows a family of 14 from Nashville, Tennessee, demonstrating their musical and dancing skills while "sharing ... talents and balancing a life at home". The family of entertainers, known onstage as The Willis Clan, reached the quarter-finals of season 9 of America's Got Talent. Parents Toby and Brenda Willis have 12 children – eight girls and four boys.

The show was cancelled on September 11, 2016, following the arrest of Toby Willis on four counts of child rape.

== Family ==
The family has a strong Christian and musical heritage with roots from south Chicago. They moved to Nashville in 2001 and have made regular appearances at the Grand Ole Opry.

== Legal issues ==
Toby Willis was arrested in Kentucky on September 9, 2016, after fleeing there to avoid arrest on a child rape that occurred in Nashville in 2004.

On July 11, 2017, Willis pleaded guilty to four counts of child rape. Cheatham County Circuit Court Clerk Julie Hibbs confirmed that Willis received two 25-year sentences on two counts and two 40-year sentences on the other two. Those sentences will be concurrent, and served at 100 percent, giving Willis a total of 40 years in prison.

== Speak My Mind and comeback ==
In early 2018, the six eldest children besides Jessica surfaced to speak out about the abuse. On July 25, 2018, the group announced that they would "see our younger siblings on their respective roads to recovery out of the spotlight," while the other siblings besides Jessica would be touring, beginning September 7. They announced the same day that they would be releasing the single "Speak My Mind" on August 10 as a promotion for their album of the same name, released on September 28, 2018.

Speak My Mind
No.	Title	Length
1.	"Speak My Mind"	3:51
2.	"What Life's About"	3:40
3.	"The Line"	4:56
4.	"Paper Dolls"	4:18
5.	"Is There More"	4:22
6.	"Set Me Free"	3:34
7.	"How Much of Me is You"	3:16
8.	"I Choose Life"	3:22
9.	"Level"	4:00
10.	"Pull You Down"	3:48
11.	"Give"	4:10
12.	"Ring of Fire"	4:13
Total length:		47:00

== Episodes ==
=== Series overview ===
Season	Episodes	Originally released	
Season	Episodes	First released	Last released
1	7	May 5, 2015	June 16, 2015
2	6	March 15, 2016	April 19, 2016

=== Season 1 (2015) ===
No. overall	No. in season	Title	Original release date
1	1	"Momma"	May 5, 2015
A couple raise 12 children who are involved in music, dance, and wrestling in Nashville, Tennessee. Brenda's birthday is coming up, but she's so busy with the kids' lives that it's in danger of being forgotten until Jessica writes a song called "Mama," which their band perform later at the Grand Ole Opry in Nashville. Also, the family helps raise money for a community charity with a concert at a local library.
2	2	"Dance Your Pants Off"	May 12, 2015
A Grand Ole Opry opportunity to perform with country star Josh Turner catches the family by surprise, so they scramble to create a dance routine and choose a song while dealing with wardrobe malfunctions before the gig.
3	3	"Willis on One Knee"	May 19, 2015
Jair gets ready to propose to his girlfriend, Mary, and his sisters are eager to help. Meanwhile, the younger kids recreate a winning dance routine their older siblings did years ago.
4	4	"Kilt the Nudies!"	May 26, 2015
New musical performances help the family get in touch with their Irish roots.
5	5	"While Mom's Away..."	June 2, 2015
Brenda and Toby's romantic dinner is interrupted by Jaeger. Later, Jessica and Jair go to New York with their mother to shoot a music video and meet with a record executive, while Toby stays at home with the other 10 kids.
6	6	"Willis's Go West"	June 9, 2015
A month-long tour includes rock climbing in Minnesota, wrestling in Colorado, and surfing on the West Coast, but the kids must also find time for schoolwork and interviews in between gigs.
7	7	"A Willis Debut"	June 16, 2015
The cross-country tour ends, but now the family prepares for their album-release party.

=== Season 2 (2016) ===
No. overall	No. in season	Title	Original release date
8	1	"Coming Home"	March 15, 2016
In the Season 2 premiere, the family returns from touring to find some uninvited guests in their house. Later, the Willises go canoeing for Jedi's 16th birthday.
9	2	"Puppy Love"	March 22, 2016
Jett goes to an awards show in North Carolina with mandolinist Cory Piatt, but they're chaperoned by Jenny and Jair. Back at home, the family starts working on a new album and recalls a tragic story, while the Willis' dog has a litter of nine puppies.
10	3	"A Frightening Find"	March 29, 2016
Jessica loses her voice, which causes concerns that Jasmine may have to fill in as the lead singer. Jazz tries to calm her nerves by singing Hit Me with Your Best Shot.
11	4	"Big Problems"	April 5, 2016
The family cheers for Jack and Jedi when they compete in a local wrestling tournament. Meanwhile, the source of an illness that's going around is discovered.
12	5	"The Invisible Enemy"	April 12, 2016
The Willises must relocate after making a startling discovery in their house, but they aren't sure where to go or what will happen to the album they're recording. Meanwhile, a show for music executives is planned; and another family band comes to town.
13	6	"Making Moves"	April 19, 2016
The family band's tour ends in Minnesota. Once they're home, the kids hurry to plan a surprise for their parents on their anniversary.
