= Mat Franco =

American magician (born 1988)

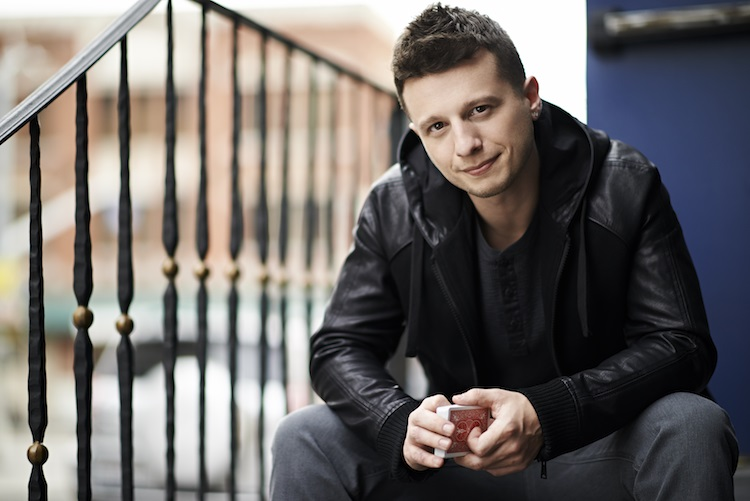
- Franco in 2015
- Born: May 10, 1988 (age 38); Johnston, Rhode Island, U.S.
- Education: University of Rhode Island
- Occupation: Magician
- Years active: 2003–present
- Known for: America's Got Talent season 9 winner Mat Franco’s Got Magic NBC TV Specials Las Vegas Headliner at The LINQ
- Website: matfranco.com

Mat Franco (born May 10, 1988) is an American magician best known for his personality-driven, skill-based sleight of hand magic. He was the first magician to win America's Got Talent, in the show's ninth season. Franco went on to produce and star in his own primetime TV specials on NBC, Mat Franco’s Got Magic. In 2015, he created and debuted his live stage show in Las Vegas, Mat Franco - Magic Reinvented Nightly. Franco is currently headlining at The LINQ Hotel + Experience at the Mat Franco Theater. In addition to winning "Best Magic Show" at the Best of Vegas Awards, Franco's live production was the top-rated magic show in Las Vegas according to Billboard.com in 2021. Mat Franco - Magic Reinvented Nightly was awarded Best Show on the Las Vegas Strip again in 2022.

== Background ==
Franco was born in Johnston, Rhode Island. After he saw magic on TV when he was four, he begged his parents to get him a magic set. He then began performing tricks in his kindergarten class. One of his greatest influences and the first assistant was his grandmother, who used to read magic instructions to Mat when he was too young to read for himself.

Franco continued studying magic as a child and performed any chance he could. When he was 12, he had saved enough money from local shows to fly to Las Vegas to study performance art with some of his idols, including Jeff McBride.

Franco graduated from Johnston High School in 2006. He studied at the University of Rhode Island, receiving a degree in Business Administration with a minor in Communication Studies.

== Early career ==
In 2003, at age 15, Franco was invited to perform onstage at the Riviera Hotel and Casino in Las Vegas, as part of a show hosted by the Society of American Magicians called "Stars of Tomorrow".

After graduating from college in 2010, Franco performed his one-man show on college campuses throughout the U.S., touring six months out of the year, for four years. He was nominated for "Fastest Rising Star" in 2012, and in 2013 was awarded "Best College Performer" by Campus Activities Magazine (based in Prosperity, South Carolina) in their Reader's Choice Awards. He would frequently return to the University of Rhode Island, his alma mater, to perform at student orientations.

Franco was always encouraged by his grandmother, Eleanor Campellone, who told an interviewer, "His mother was always working and he couldn't show her everything -- look mom, look mom. So the grandma was there and I had all the time in the world. I'd spend hours watching his tricks."

== America's Got Talent ==
In 2014, Franco achieved mainstream success as the winner of America's Got Talent.

=== AGT appearances ===
- June 17, 2014: Audition – In Los Angeles, during Episode 904, Franco used card manipulation to impress the judges (Howard Stern, Heidi Klum, Mel B and Howie Mandel). With a shuffled deck of cards he told a story that he wrote about America's Got Talent. (The audition was recorded in April in the Dolby Theatre in Los Angeles.) And got a standing ovation.
- July 22, 2014: Judgment Week – In Episode 907, Franco performed a visual interactive card trick where he painted a picture of Howie Mandel on the Judges' desk, using just a deck of cards. This performance earned four Yes votes again.
- August 5, 2014: Quarterfinals – Franco appeared in Episode 911 and used Heidi Klum as his assistant. His tricks with fire and with disappearing and reappearing cards earned him four Yes votes and standing ovations.
- August 6, 2014: Quarterfinals – In Episode 912 in New York, Franco was one among five acts to proceed to the Semifinals.
- September 2, 2014: Semifinals – In Episode 919, Franco was one of twelve acts competing for six opportunities in the Top 12 Finals. After having Howie, Howard, and Heidi choose three random cards (6, 4, and 2), he borrowed Mel B's phone; dropped it into liquid; vanished the phone using a hair dryer; and then moved into the middle of the audience at Radio City Music Hall to cut open seat #642, revealing Mel's phone inside the seat cushion.
- September 3, 2014: Semifinals – In episode 920, Franco was Voted through to the Top 12.
- September 9, 2014: Top 12 – In episode 921, Franco performed an interactive trick with the live audience, including the judges, and even the home viewers. He had everyone at home select a card, and using cannon, was able to get the selected card stuck to the ceiling at Radio City Music Hall.
- September 10, 2014: Top 12 Results – in episode 922, Franco was voted through to the Finals, and was declared the last magician standing in the competition.
- September 16, 2014: Finals – In the finale, each performer had to do a reprise of a previous performance. Franco chose to do a twist on his audition, by doing a version of cups and balls, accompanied by another story that he wrote about the judges. Later on in the episode, Franco performed a large scale trick which included a "human deck" of cards, which consisted of 52 random audience members that Nick Cannon chose, and brought on stage.
- September 17, 2014: Finals Results – Franco appeared as one of six finalists at Radio City Music Hall in New York City. The show, in which Franco used Rosie O'Donnell and Howard Stern as assistants, aired on television on September 17.

At the conclusion of the finale, Franco was announced as the winner.

After winning season 9 in 2014, Franco was the first guest performer to appear on the tenth season. He also made a second guest appearance later that season for another performance on the finale episode in 2015. Franco returned for guest performances in 2016 and 2017. Later that year, Franco created a Holiday-themed performance for the AGT Christmas Special. In the season 15 finale, Franco appeared in a comedic segment in which he taught Terry Crews how to perform magic. That same season, Franco appeared on the show with a special “socially distanced” performance. In 2021, Franco appeared on the season 16 Finale episode for a special collaborative performance with Dustin Tavella, who went on to win that season. Most recently, Franco was a featured guest on the finale episode of America's Got Talent: All-Stars in 2023.

=== Reception ===
Since Franco's Las Vegas show opening in 2015, it has raked in a slew of accolades and awards including "Best Magic Show" "Best Performance Venue" "Best Production Show" in the Best of Las Vegas Awards sponsored by the Las Vegas Review Journal.

As of 2020, Franco's live production show rates highest (average 4.8 / 5 stars) among all magic shows in Las Vegas according to user reviews on the largest Las Vegas ticketing broker, Vegas.com, as well as Yelp and Trip Advisor.

The Las Vegas Review-Journal wrote of Franco's stint on America's Got Talent: "Franco did a crafty job of customizing his prediction-based, sleight-of-hand magic to make maximum use of Talent judges Howard Stern and Mel B. And he displayed a personality and sense of humor that other magicians were not able to convey in their limited camera time."

It's been said that Franco "specializes in creating customized, interactive presentations for his audiences that allow for spontaneity and improvisation. For Mat, magic isn't about 'tricking' or 'fooling' the audience; it's about connecting with people and bringing smiles to their faces."

== Career ==
Franco began headlining in Las Vegas at LINQ Hotel & Casino on August 5, 2015. The show is titled "Mat Franco: Magic Reinvented Nightly". By 2016 the show was named "Best Magic Show in Las Vegas" by the Las Vegas Review Journal.

Franco has made numerous guest appearances on talk shows, including The Ellen DeGeneres Show, Access Hollywood, and The Today Show.

Franco returned to Radio City Music Hall as the featured guest performer on America's Got Talent for the first live broadcast of the show's tenth season (August 12, 2015). He later returned for the season finale.

Franco starred in his own two-hour magic TV special titled Mat Franco's Got Magic that aired on NBC on September 17, and December 9, 2015.

Franco started to actively post his tricks on his YouTube channel in April 2015. He currently has over 200,000 subscribers to his channel.

In 2016, his Vegas show was awarded "Best Show" on the Las Vegas Strip in the "Las Vegas Weekly Readers' Choice Awards".

In February 2017, Mat Franco returned to his alma mater University of Rhode Island for a show celebrating the university's 125th anniversary.

On July 10, 2017, the LINQ officially renamed the theater the "Mat Franco Theater" and the city of Las Vegas presented Franco with a key to the Las Vegas Strip and declared July 10 "Mat Franco Day."

In 2020, Caesars Entertainment announced signing new deal with Franco, including a 5-year extension of his residency show "Mat Franco - Magic Reinvented Nightly" at the LINQ Hotel + Experience.

Preceded by Kenichi Ebina	America's Got Talent winner Season 9 (Summer 2014)	Succeeded by Paul Zerdin
