= Kenichi Ebina =

Japanese performance artist (born 1974)

Kenichi Ebina (蛯名 健一)
- Born: May 25, 1974 (age 52); Japan
- Occupation: Dancer
- Years active: 1998–present
- Known for: Winner of America's Got Talent Season 8
- Style: freestyle, hip-hop, mime, martial arts, jazz, ethnic dance
- Website: www.ebinaperformingarts.com

Kenichi Ebina (蛯名 健一, Ebina Ken'ichi; born May 25, 1974) is a Japanese performance artist who is best known for winning the eighth season of America's Got Talent on September 18, 2013. His solo act, labeled 'dance-ish' by Ebina, features his unique self-taught style which combines acting, storytelling, and a number of different dance styles, including freestyle, hip-hop, mime, martial arts, jazz, and ethnic dance. He frequently interacts with characters on a video screen behind him, who have all been created and played by himself.

== Early life and career ==
Kenichi was born 1974, Ebina earned his Associate of Arts in general studies from the University of Bridgeport in 1998 and a Bachelor of Arts in mass communications in 2000 from the same university. Kenichi has a wife and daughter in Japan.

== Apollo Amateur Night ==
In 2006 and 2007, he won the Apollo Amateur Night two times and became grand champion for the season. In 2001, his dance troupe BiTriP won first place at the Apollo Amateur Night. He remains the only two-time grand champion. He is also featured in Angelina Ballerina: The Next Steps’ Camembert Academy’s Shining Stars, where he talks about his dance performance involving a story about a mannequin brought to life.

== America's Got Talent ==
He performed at the Chicago auditions, doing a Matrix-style "dance-ish" performance that wowed the judges, gaining "yes" votes from all four judges. He was automatically sent through to the live rounds at Radio City Music Hall without needing to perform during Vegas week.

On August 6, 2013, in the quarterfinals, he performed a dance/martial arts routine at Radio City Music Hall in New York City, in which he interacted with a video that was playing on a large screen behind him. Kenichi also portrayed every character shown on the video behind him. On the August 7 results show, he was voted through to the semi-finals.

On September 3, Kenichi performed an elaborate dance/mime routine with a projected version of himself and was voted into the top 12. On September 10, he performed an interpretive dance about love, death and the afterlife and was voted into the finals. In the finals, his first performance was a remix of his original audition wowing the judges once more and the second performance was him interacting with 8 characters projected on a screen behind him. All characters were portrayed by Kenichi as well. After performing two dance routines during the finals on September 17, he was announced the winner of the eighth season of America's Got Talent on September 18, 2013. He was also the first dance and first foreign act to win the competition.

On the Season 9 Quarterfinal results show on August 13, 2014, Kenichi returned as a guest, performing a routine based on his audition performance, while interacting with versions of himself with superimposed faces of Heidi and Howie. The performance was also a demonstration of the app he is working on (apparently titled "Dance-ish Me") to be released in September, although no other specifics were mentioned.

Kenichi later returned to and participated in America's Got Talent: The Champions in 2019, but didn't receive enough votes to advance to the finals.

Preceded by Olate Dogs	America's Got Talent winner Season 8 (Summer 2013)	Succeeded by Mat Franco
