= R. Prasanna =

Ramaswamy Prasanna
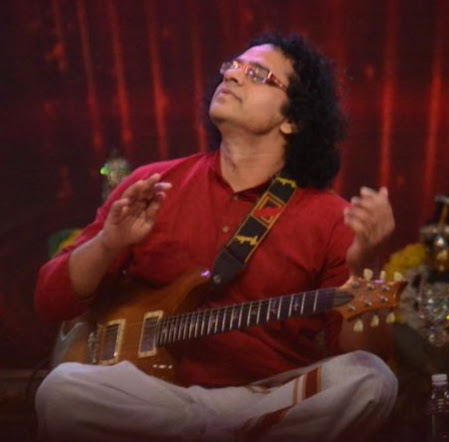
- Prasanna at one of his concerts in Chennai

Background information
- Born: October 2, 1970 (age 56); India
- Genres: Carnatic rock, jazz rock, rock, folk rock
- Occupations: Musician, composer, educator
- Instruments: Guitar, bass, piano, percussion
- Website: www.guitarprasanna.com

Prasanna Ramaswamy (better known as Guitar Prasanna), is a known for performing Carnatic music on the guitar. He also plays jazz, progressive rock, and world fusion. The renowned Indian Mathematician Ramanujan is Prasanna’s granduncle (i.e. father's periappa).

== Early life and background ==
Prasanna grew up in Chennai, India and developed an interest for the guitar at the age of five after hearing his neighbor play. He received his first guitar when he was ten years old and would try to play Tamil and Hindi film songs and imitate the sounds of his sister's Carnatic singing with the instrument. His interest in Western pop music developed when his father's colleague gave him some cassette tapes with songs by the Bee Gees, ABBA, Toto, Peaches and Herb, and the Pointer Sisters.

In high school, he became known as a guitarist with local band XIth Commandment. While studying naval architecture at the Indian institute of Technology, Madras (where he also met his wife Shalini), he toured India with his rock bands (The Haze and then Shakuni & the Birds of Prey), covering songs by Santana, Led Zeppelin, Deep Purple, Rush, Steely Dan, Jethro Tull, and the Scorpions and compositions like "Peaceful" and "Blues for Saraswati". Prasanna's musical development led him to blues and jazz. After working as a software consultant, he gave up a career in engineering and IT and moved to Boston to attend Berklee College of Music where he majored in Jazz and Classical Composition.

== Education ==
Prasanna received a Bachelor's degree in Naval Architecture from the Indian Institute of Technology, Madras in 1992. He also graduated magna cum laude from the Berklee College of Music, Boston.

== Educator ==
- Established Swarnabhoomi Academy of Music and served as it president
- Faculty member at Banff Centre for Arts and Creativity, Canada for international workshop in Jazz and Creative Music in May 2008
- Lectures and clinics at Harvard University, Institute of Music at Osnabrück University, Berklee College of Music, MIT, Tufts University, New School in New York, University of Arizona, Utah State University

== Influence ==
Prasanna is the mentor of Maya Neelakantan, a ten-year-old Guitar prodigy who auditioned at the America's Got Talentseason 19 in June 2024, and made a global sensation with her Carnatic rendering of the "Last Resort" by Papa Roach.

== Discography ==
=== As leader ===
- Guitar Goes Classical (Audio Fine, 1993) (India)
- Evergreen Melodies on Guitar (Keerthana, 1993) (India)
- Evergreen Classicals on Guitar (Keerthana, 1993) (India)
- Vibrant Aesthetics (Inreco, 1993) (India)
- Spirit of Youth (Saragam, 1993) (India)
- Guitar Indian Style (Oriental, 1996) (U.S.)
- Roots (Sangeetha/His Master's Voice, 1997) (India)
- Echo (Saican, 2000) (Canada)
- Apoorva Ragas on Guitar (Kalakendra, 2000) (U.S.)
- Natabhairavi (Inreco, 2000) (India)
- Shakthi: The Omnipotent (Music Today, 2000) (India)
- Peaceful (Susila, 2001)
- Ragamorphism – Guitar instructional DVD (Susila, 2004)
- Be the Change (Susila, 2004)
- Ra Rama (Kosmic, 2005) (India)
- Electric Ganesha Land (Susila, 2006)
- Live in Sedona DVD (Susila, 2009)
- Ragabop Trio (Abstract Logix, 2010) with Steve Smith, George Brooks
- Tirtha (ACT, 2011) with Vijay Iyer, Nitin Mitta
- All Terrain Guitar (Susila, 2016)
- "Apna Ek Kal" feat. Anuradha Palakurthi and Hariharan (2016) (single)

=== Special projects ===
- Summa cum Jazz (BMG, 1999)
- Lagaan (Sony, 2001) with A.R. Rahman
- Moon Guitars (De Werf, 2002) – Fabrizio Cassol, Prasanna, David Gilmore
- Million Dollar Arm (Walt Disney, 2014)
- The Hundred Foot Journey (Hollywood, 2014)

=== As guest ===
- Play by Ear – Deep C, 2002
- Peace in Progress – Manisha Shahane, 2003
- Apfelschaun – Ben Schwendener/Uwe Steinmetz (Gravity Arts, 2003)
- Moving – Tony Grey, 2004
- The Music Messiah – Illayaraja (Agi Music, 2006)
- Hidden Mandala – Marc Rossi (Gravity Records, 2008)
- Inner Duality – David Hines (Spice Rack Records, 2009)
- Mantra Revealed – Marc Rossi (Innova, 2012)

=== Soundtracks ===
- Kochadaiyan (Tamil) – A.R. Rahman, 2014
- Highway (Bollywood) – A.R.Rahman, 2014
- Essaye Moi (French) – Pierre Van Dormael, 2006
- Mumbai Express (Tamil) – Illayaraja, 2005
- Ghajini background score (Tamil) – Harris Jayaraj, 2005
- Swades (Bollywood) – A.R.Rahman, 2004
- Dil ne Jisa apna kaha (Bollywood) – A.R.Rahman, 2004
- Udhaya (Tamil) – A.R.Rahman, 2003
- Ramanaa (Tamil) – Illayaraja, 2002
- Nee Romba Azhaga Irukke (Tamil) – Aravind/Jaishankar, 2002
- Lagaan film (Bollywood) – A.R.Rahman, 2001
- Grahan film background score (Bollywood) – Karthik Raja, 2001
- Dumm Dumm Dumm (Tamil) – Karthik Raja, 2001
- Vanchinathan (Tamil) – Karthik Raja, 2001
- Pukar (Bollywood) – A.R.Rahman, 2000
- Split Wide Open (English) – Karthik Raja, 1999
- Harischandra (Tamil) – Agosh, 1999
- Enn Swasa Kaatre (Tamil) – A.R.Rahman, 1998
- Jeans (Tamil) – A.R.Rahman, 1998
- Kizhakkum Merkkum (Tamil) – Illayaraja, 1998
- Zor (Bollywood) – Agosh, 1998
- Nam iruvar namakku iruvar (Tamil) – Karthik Raja, 1998
- Kadhala Kadhala (Tamil) – Karthik Raja, 1998
- Ullasam (Tamil) – Karthik Raja, 1996
- Lovebirds (Tamil) – A.R.Rahman, 1996
- Muthu (Tamil) – A.R.Rahman, 1995
- Puthiya Mugam (Tamil) – A.R.Rahman, 1992

== Composer ==
=== Film ===
- Framed (2007)
- Smile Pinki (2009)
- The Open Frame (2011)
- Vazhakku Enn 18/9 (2012)
- Algorithms (2012)
- After My Garden Grows (2014)

=== Dance Theater ===
- Soliloquy (1997)
- Sanaatana (2001)
- DNA in Dance (2004)
- The Tempest (2004)
- A Story and a Song (2007)
