= Climate Live =

2021 advocacy concert

- Dates: 24 April 2021; 16 October 2021; 22 October 2022
- Years active: 2020-2024
- Founders: Frances Fox
- Organiser: Fridays For Future, School Strike 4 Climate
- Website: climatelive.org

Climate Live is a youth led climate education movement which organises local outreach programs and a series of international concerts hosted every year in over 60+ countries. The concert series was developed by Fridays for Future organisers. Climate Live launched on April 24 with performances by notable artists including Declan McKenna, Milky Chance, Helen Sjöholm, Lia Pappas-Kemps, Lina Mirai, and Oscar Stembridge, as well as supporting messages from Any Gabrielly and Gretchen.

== Development ==
The concerts were announced on 20 November 2020 by a group of activists and artists including Activist Greta Thunberg, Artists Glass Animals, Sam Fender, Declan McKenna, Groove Armada, Thomas Headon, Sundara Karma, The Wombats, and Ida Young, as well as Environmental Filmmaker Jack Harries and supermodel Eunice Olumide. Christiana Figueres, former executive secretary of the UNFCCC, also gave her support for the project, crediting young people with bringing the climate crisis to leaders' attention and urging older generations to deliver on the Paris Agreement.

Climate Live was organised by youth climate activists in conjunction with music and event professionals.

Frances Fox, founder of Climate Live, said that the inspiration for Climate Live came in Spring 2019 from "an interview in which Brian May said there should be a Live Aid for the climate crisis."

The organisers aimed to use music to engage, educate and empower new audiences to pressure world leaders to take action to combat the climate crisis, with a focus on UNFCCC conferences where countries renew their climate pledges.

Climate Live is now based in over 60 countries where its organisers are focusing on local climate action programs. The movement is led by a youth assembly which consists of youth representatives from each country and an international coordination team composed of youth climate activists Tafadzwa Chando and many other activists from the Global South. At COP28 in Dubai, Climate Live had a pavilion which hosted a number of influential Musicians, Global Leaders and Influencers.

== Launch ==
Climate Live officially launched on April 24, 2021, with concerts and actions in the United Kingdom, Uruguay, Brazil, Germany, Uganda, Canada, Mexico, The Netherlands, Colombia, Sweden, Portugal, Ireland, DRC, Spain, Japan, and Afghanistan.
