= Learnmore Jonasi =

Zimbabwean comedian, actor and MC (born 1993)

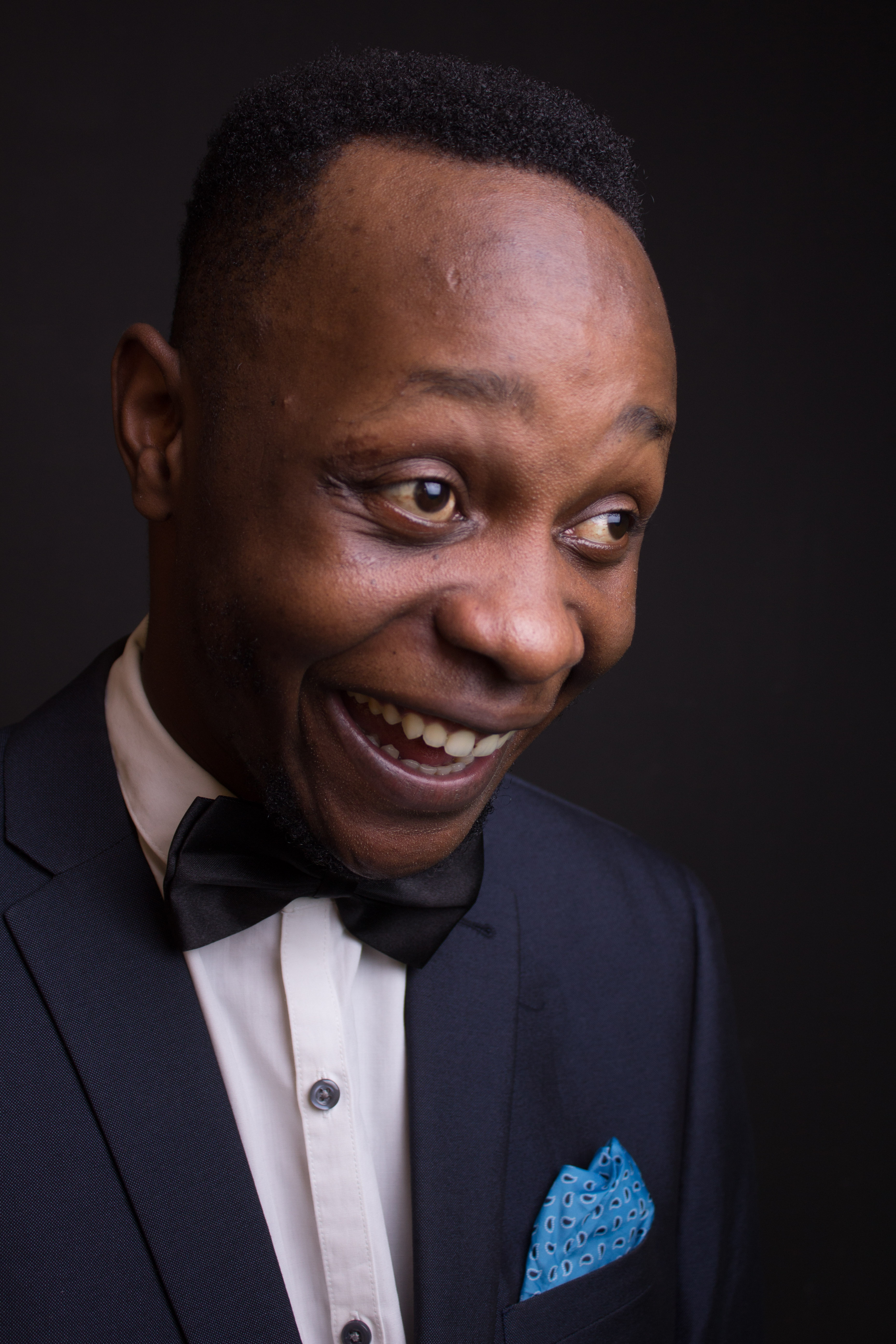
- Learnmore in 2019
- Born: Learnmore Mwanyenyeka; 22 August 1993 (age 33); Mutare, Zimbabwe

Comedy career
- Years active: 2010-present
- Medium: Stand-up; film; television
- Genres: Observational comedy; surreal humor
- Subjects: Everyday life; Village life; Self-deprecation
- Website: learnmorejonasi.com

Learnmore Mwanyenyeka (born 22 August 1993), formerly known as Long John the Comedian, now known professionally as Learnmore Jonasi, is a Zimbabwean stand-up comedian, actor and MC. He is also known as "The Village Boy" and has won the 2019 National Arts Merit Awards as the Outstanding Comedian of the Year and the 2019 Savanna Comic Choice Awards as the Pan African Comic of the Year. He was people's choice award winner in Steve Harvey's Stand Up Spotlight competition in 2019. In 2020 he won the National Arts Merit Awards as the Outstanding Comedian of the Year.

== Early life and education ==
Learnmore was born 22 August 1993 as Learnmore Mwanyeyeka at Dangamvura Hospital in Mutare, Manicaland, Zimbabwe. He never met his father and does not know his name. His mother, Memory Mwanyenyeka, is a Kindergarten teacher in South Africa. He was raised by his grandparents, Partson Mwanyenyeka, a government pensioner and Lillian Mwanyenyeka in Chimanimani.

During the years 1999 to 2000, he went to Chimanimani Primary School between Grade 1 and 2. When his grandfather was retrenched from work, in 2000, they moved to Mutare where he continued his education at Sheni Primary School from Grade 3 up to the time he sat his ZIMSEC Grade 7 Certificate. In 2006, he joined Chimanimani High School, and in 2010, he sat his ZIMSEC General Certificate of Education Ordinary Level.

== Career ==
=== 2011–2020 ===
After completing his O level in 2010, he went to Harare to start his comedic journey but he did not have any relatives there where he could stay. In 2011 he traveled to Bulawayo to find a comedy club but found none. In 2012 he left for Harare where he performed for the first time on 9 October 2012 at the Simuka Comedy Night hosted at Book café. He was booed by the audience. For almost two years, he couldn't make people laugh at the open mic yet he kept coming back every Monday to perform. He would perform stand-up in local bars, open-mic nights, and community gatherings, often doing free shows to refine his act.

In 2014, he then went back to Bulawayo, where a new comedy club called Umahlekisa had been formed. He was helped by the founder, Ntando Van Moyo with stage time and honing skills to be a better comedian. He became affectionately known as "The Village Boy from Chimanimani" because of his village jokes. In October 2014, he began his first international tour in South Africa at The Box Comedy Club hosted at Pop Art Theatre Johannesburg.

In December 2015 he performed his first one man show titled The Longest Yard at Alliance Francaise Harare.

27 February 2016 was the first time he opened for Barry Hilton. In the same year, he was invited to perform at the African Comedy Festival at the Hippodrum Auditorium in Golders Green in the United Kingdom. While in the United Kingdom, he did a course with Laughing Horse to improve on his skills. On 22 June 2016, he hosted his second one man show titled The Village boy at the Reps Theatre in Harare, Zimbabwe.

On 27 April 2017, Learnmore performed in a three day comedy festival at the Swaziland International Comedy Festival, hosted by Chigubu. On 2 March 2018 he headlined the Major Moves Comedy Nights in Botswana at Zambezi Towers. On 29 June, he performed in Uganda at the Kampala Comedy Festival, hosted by Okello Okello. In July 2018, he performed in Rwanda at the Kigali International Comedy Festival along several Ugandans and Daliso Chaponda.

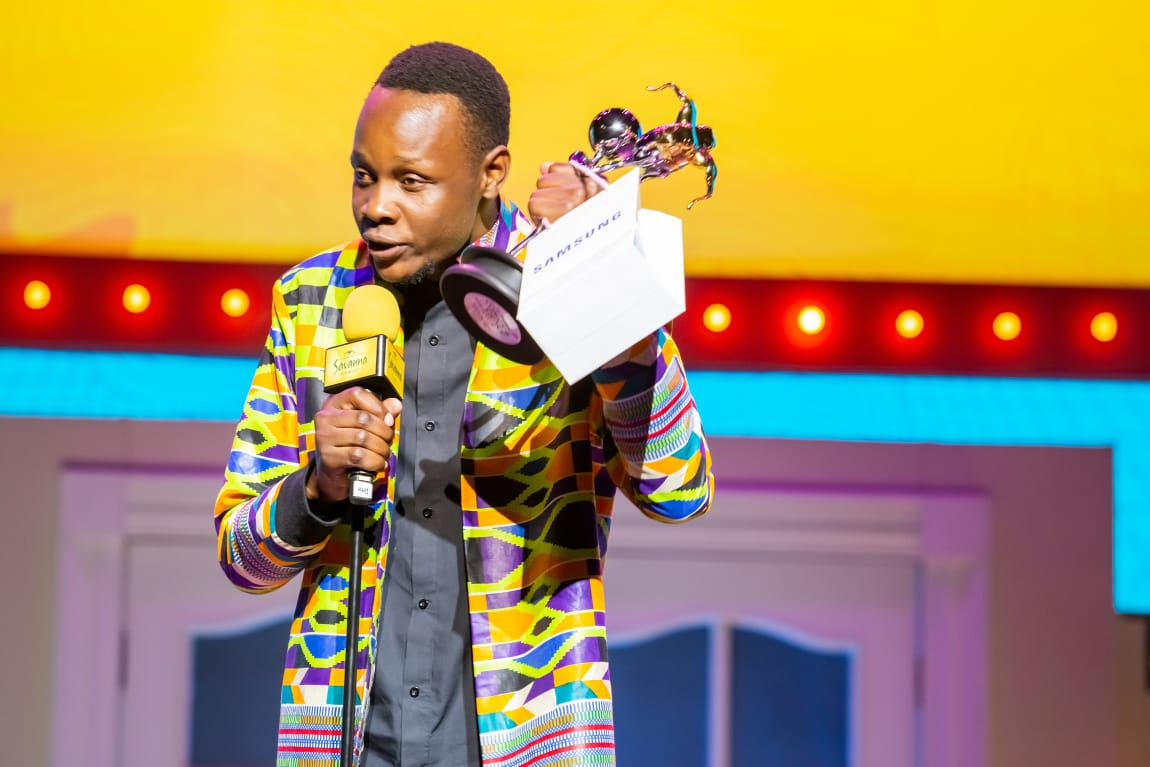
Learnmore Jonasi receiving the 2019 Pan African Comic of the Year Award

In April 2019, Learnmore headlined at the Free Your Mind's (FYM) monthly stand-up comedy show, hosted by Courage the Comedian in Namibia. In the same month, he won the National Arts Merit Awards (NAMA). On 3 May 2019 he performed at the Hicofest, in Botswana. On 7 September 2019 he won the Pan African Comic of The Year Awards at the 9th South African Savannah Comics Choice Awards in Johannesburg, South Africa at the Lyric Theatre. He dedicated his award to the people affected by Cyclone Idai that hit the Eastern Highlands of Zimbabwe in March. In November, he was the people's choice award winner in the Steve Harvey's Stand Up Spotlight Competition.

In March 2020 he won his second NAMA Award as Outstanding Comedian of the Year. In October 2020, Learnmore won the Best Stand up Comedy Award at the All The Laughs Comedy Awards hosted in Atlanta. He was then nominated in three categories; People's Choice Awards, Outstanding Achievement in Entertainment and Male Personality of the Year for in the 6th annual Zimbabwe Achievers Awards South Africa (ZAA SA) and he won as Male Personality of the Year during the award ceremony in December.

=== 2021–present ===
In 2021, Learnmore was part of the cast of the second season of Savanna Virtual Comedy Bar hosted by Comedy Central on DStv. Later in 2021 he relocated to Pittsburgh, USA, after being offered a residency with the Steel City Arts Foundation (Steel City AF), founded by comedian Steve Hofstetter. This marked his transition into the American comedy scene during the COVID-19 period.

In March 2022, he placed second at the World Series of Comedy Competition held at the Punchline Comedy Club in Atlanta, GA.

In May 2023, he was the winner of the Boston Comedy Festival at the Cutler Majestic Theatre in Boston. The following month, on June 10, won the Audience Choice Award at the Jersey City Comedy Festival in New Jersey.

In 2024, he competed on America's Got Talent (Season 19), where he received the Golden Buzzer from host Terry Crews for his audition performance that drew on Zimbabwean culture and humorous observations about life in America. During the quarter-finals of AGT, his physical comedy and cross-cultural storytelling earned strong praise from judges Simon Cowell and Howie Mandel, with media outlets noting his ability to connect with both African and American audiences. In the Season 19 finale of America’s Got Talent on 25 September 2024, Jonasi placed in the Top 5, with the competition ultimately won by singer Richard Goodall.

In July 2025, Learnmore performed at the Blue Heron Brewery and Event Centre, Medina County, Ohio as part of the Secret Society Comedy

While appearing as a guest at One54 Africa podcast in February 2026, Learnmore jokingly mis-translated the lyrics to the opening line of the "Circle of Life" chant, "Nants’ingonyama bagithi Baba," in English to "Look, there's a lion. Oh my god." The clips have since gone viral. Lebo M, who co-wrote “The Circle of Life”, did not like the translation made by Learnmore. On 16 March 2026, Lebo M filed a $27M lawsuit against Learnmore citing "misrepresentations, defamatory conduct, and unlawful commercial exploitation”. The lawsuit was later dismissed.

=== One Man Shows ===
- 2015 - The Longest Yard
- 2016 - The Village Boy

=== Genres ===
- Self-deprecation comedy
- Situational comedy

== Filmography ==
=== Television ===
| Year | Show | Roles | Notes | Network |
|---|---|---|---|---|
| 2018 | Mzansi Comedy Nights | | | Mzansi Magic (DStv) |
| 2018 | The Last Laugh with Stuart Taylor | | | Showmax |
| 2019 | Funny People Africa | | | Showmax |
| 2026 | ComicView: Rooftop Series | | Episode: "Kelly Kellz, Learnmore Jonasi & Shuler King" | BET |

== Awards and nominations ==
| Year | Award | Category | Nominees | Result |
|---|---|---|---|---|
| 2019 | National Arts Merit Awards | Outstanding Comedian of the Year | Sharon Chideu aka Magi and Dumisani Hubert Ndlovu aka Maforty-forty | Won |
| 2019 | Savannah Comic Choice Awards | Pan African Comic of the Year | Alfred Kainga (Zimbabwe), Anne Kansiime (Uganda), Basketmouth (Nigeria) and Chingliz(Zambia). | Won. |
| 2019 | Steve Harvey's Standup Spotlight | People's Choice Award | | Won |
| 2020 | National Arts Merit Awards | Outstanding Comedian of the Year | Maforty, and Andrew Manyika | Won |
| 2020 | All The Laughs Comedy Awards | Best Stand Up Comedy | | Won |
| 2020 | Zimbabwe Achievers Awards SA | Peoples Choice Awards | Vongai Mapho, Lewis John, Shasha, Chaka Photography, Odette Chiedza Chikwiti | Nominated |
| 2020 | Zimbabwe Achievers Awards SA | Outstanding Achievement in Entertainment | Shasha, Nkululeko “Chunky” Phiri, Tuks Tad Lungu, Q Dube Siziba | Nominated |
| 2020 | Zimbabwe Achievers Awards SA | Male Personality of The Year | Tawanda Tadzimirwa, Gift Ngwenya, Babusi Nyoni, Tawanda Chikasha | Won |
