= Maya Neelakantan =

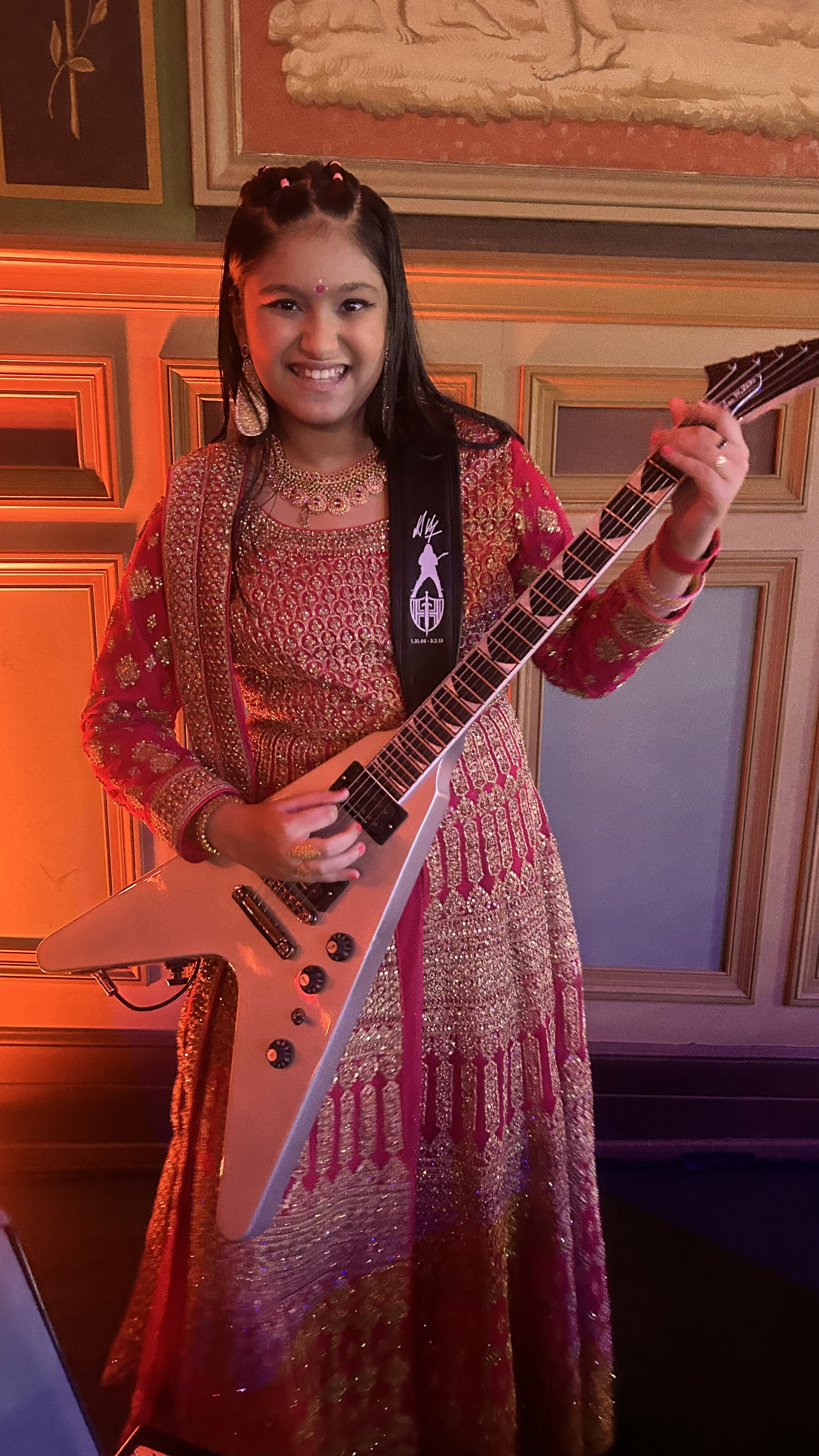

Background information
- Born: 4 May 2013 (age 13); Chennai, India
- Genres: Carnatic, Heavy Metal, Rock, World fusion
- Occupation: Musician
- Instrument: Guitar

Maya Neelakantan (born 4 May 2013) is an Indian music prodigy and guitarist from Chennai, Tamil Nadu. Playing heavy metal music since six years of age and also learning Carnatic music from nine years of age, she auditioned at the America's Got Talent season 19 in April 2024. Her performance, an instrumental fusion of Carnatic intro and the heavy metal song "Last Resort" by Papa Roach, became a sensational hit. For her guitar prowess, Simon Cowell called her the "rock goddess." Playing Metallica's "Master of Puppets" at the quarterfinals, she could not make it to the next round.

== Background ==
Neelakantan was born in MRC Nagar, Raja Annamalai Puram, Chennai, Tamil Nadu. Her father runs an IT company, and her mother, Lorina, is an Australian entrepreneur. Her parents met in Australia where her father studied astrophysics. Her father, though not a professional guitarist, had a passion for playing riffs from Metallica and Slayer, from which she got her influence in rock music. At the age of six, she started learning to play guitar with the help of her father. The first song she learned was Metallica's "For Whom The Bell Tolls". In 2022, she joined formal music lesson in an online tutorial of Prasanna Ramaswamy (mostly known as Guitar Prasanna), a fellow Tamil who is based in New York City. Prasanna taught her Carnatic music. She debuted her public performance at an ashram in Kolathur, near her hometown in 2023, where she played Carnatic music.

Neelakantan's father created a YouTube channel in his daughter's name. At age eight, he recorded some of her guitar playings and started posting on the channel. Her cover of "7empest", a song by the Grammy-winning American rock band Tool, in 2022 became a hit and was appreciated by Adam Jones, Tool's guitarist. Jones immediately followed her on an Instagram account, and gifted her an electric guitar, a Gibson Adam Jones Les Paul Standard.

Neelakantan completed her elementary education in a traditional school in Chennai. As of 2024, she continues her study in secondary education in Education World Wide, a US-based international online education platform. Being homeschooled through online system, playing guitar became a convenient hobby.

== America's Got Talent ==
=== Audition ===
Neelakantan's audition at the America's Got Talent season 19 was broadcast on 25 June 2024 at Los Angeles. (The actual audition was two months before, when she was still 10 years old). Dressed in traditional Ghagra choli and a bindi on her forehead, in lehenga-style sari, complete with traditional jewellery, she played a Carnatic devotional intro (Natabhairavi) which she blended into the heavy metal song "Last Resort" by Papa Roach. She used the Gibson Les Paul, signed and presented to her by Jones. Gary Holt, guitarist of Exodus and Slayer, who had become a fan joined her from Sacramento to support her audition.

==== Reactions ====
All the AGT judges praised Neelakantan. Sofia Vergara called hers "the perfect audition." Heidi Klum commented her as "absolutely incredible" and "gutsy." Cowell remarked: "You were so shy, and you're 10, and then you turned into, like, this rock goddess." Howie Mandel predicted the performance: "I think you just picked yourself up a viral moment."

Pappa Roach quickly commented on Instagram: "Let’s gooo!! Absolutely killed it, Maya!" Gibson company wrote: "CONGRATULATIONS MAYA!! YOU ROCK." Holt commented: "She was EPIC!!" Anand Mahindra, chairman of the Mahindra Group, mentioned her on Twitter: "Yes, Simon, she's a Rock Goddess. From the land of Goddesses." He also stated that Neelakantan is invited to perform at the upcoming Mahindra Blues Festival, an annual music festival held in Mumbai, India.

In July 2024, an Indian dairy corporation, Amul honoured her by issuing a cartoon of her AGT performance with a caption: "#Amul Topical: Young Chennai guitarist Maya Neelakantan creates viral waves!"

=== Quarterfinals ===
At the quarterfinals live show on 28 August, Neelakantan performed Metallica's "Master of Puppets" using Gibson Flying V metallic silver. The song was with a permission from Metallica, for which Cowell commented: "I gotta say a big, big thank you to Metallica for giving you that song. That doesn't happen very often." The guitar was a recent gift from Gibson company. She was eliminated at the competition for the semifinals.

== Supporters and influencers ==
=== Adam Jones ===
Tool's guitarist Jones noticed Neelakantan in 2022 from her cover of 7empest. Tool's songs with complex and elaborate arrangements are the kind favoured by Neelakantan. Jones was so impressed by the performance that he sent her a signed Gibson 1979 Les Paul (customized Gibson Adam Jones Les Paul). Neelakantan said of Jones: "He actually messaged me a while ago saying that he does have a gift for me, but I never expected it to be something like this," and embracing the present, "Thank you so much, Adam Jones. This is really the biggest moment of my life!" Jones became the first follower on Neelakantan's Instagram account.

=== Gary Holt ===
Holt had been an admirer and supporter of Neelakantan. He went to Los Angeles from Sacramento to cheer her at the AGT audition. He posted: "Lisa Holt and I on our way to LA so see our friend Maya Neelakantan perform on America's Got Talent, so stoked for her! Can't wait to cheer her on!!!" Neelakantan was deeply moved by the support and wrote: "I had an incredible day! Played on America's Got Talent and on stage for the first time ever! And met the guitar legend Gary Holt for the first time ever! What a day!" Holt later revealed that he served as Neelakantan's mentor for the audition.

In March 2024, Holt gave Neelakantan a personally signed Holt Signature ESP guitar during their first meeting at his residence. Neelakantan posted on Twitter: Look What Happened Today! Gary Holt of Slayer/Exodus gifted me his signature guitar!!!"

== Music style and instrument ==
=== Carnatic music and heavy metal ===
Neelakantan’s first taste of music began at the age of two when her grandmother introduced her to Carnatic music. When she was learned metal music at age six, her grandmother still wanted her to go into Carnatic music on the guitar. At age nine, she came across Prasanna, another Chennaiite based in New York City. Prasanna had extensively worked with Indian music giant A. R. Rahman and pioneered the performance of Carnatic music on a string instrument. Neelakantan noted: "I felt I wanted to do something more. I was looking to see if I can play Carnatic on guitar when I stumbled upon guitar Prasanna.". "He is based out of the US and so I learnt to play Carnatic music on guitar from him online," she says. Her formal training with Prasanna is for just half an hour a week. She wanted a fusion of metal and Carnatic music as her main music stream, saying,"When I listen to thrash metal, I become pumped and energetic. Carnatic music, on the other hand, gives me a spiritual and divine feeling. The atmosphere would immediately change the moment Carnatic music is playing. So I wanted to merge them both. I really loved how music takes you on a journey. Between Prasanna and rock legends, she says she eventually found her groove.

=== Guitar ===
At age five, Neelakantan started playing toy guitar, which was replaced the next year by a real one. Jones's Gibson Les Paul became her favourite. In 2023, knowing of her ability and attachment to the guitar brand, Gibson enrolled her in the Gibson Generation Group Class of 2025. The programme is a two-year mentorship program for a new generation of musicians. As part of the program, Maya get to be endorsed by Gibson, collaborate with other Gibson artists, meet various management teams and luthiers from Gibson, VIP access to Gibson garage and able to try new Gibson products.

Maya is also close friends with the Gibson CEO/President Cesar Gueikian. On her visit to Nashville earlier in 2024, she was hosted at the Gibson Garage by Gueikian, where she got a chance to play some of the most iconic guitars made by them.
