= Chris Turner (comedian) =

British and American comedian (born 1989)

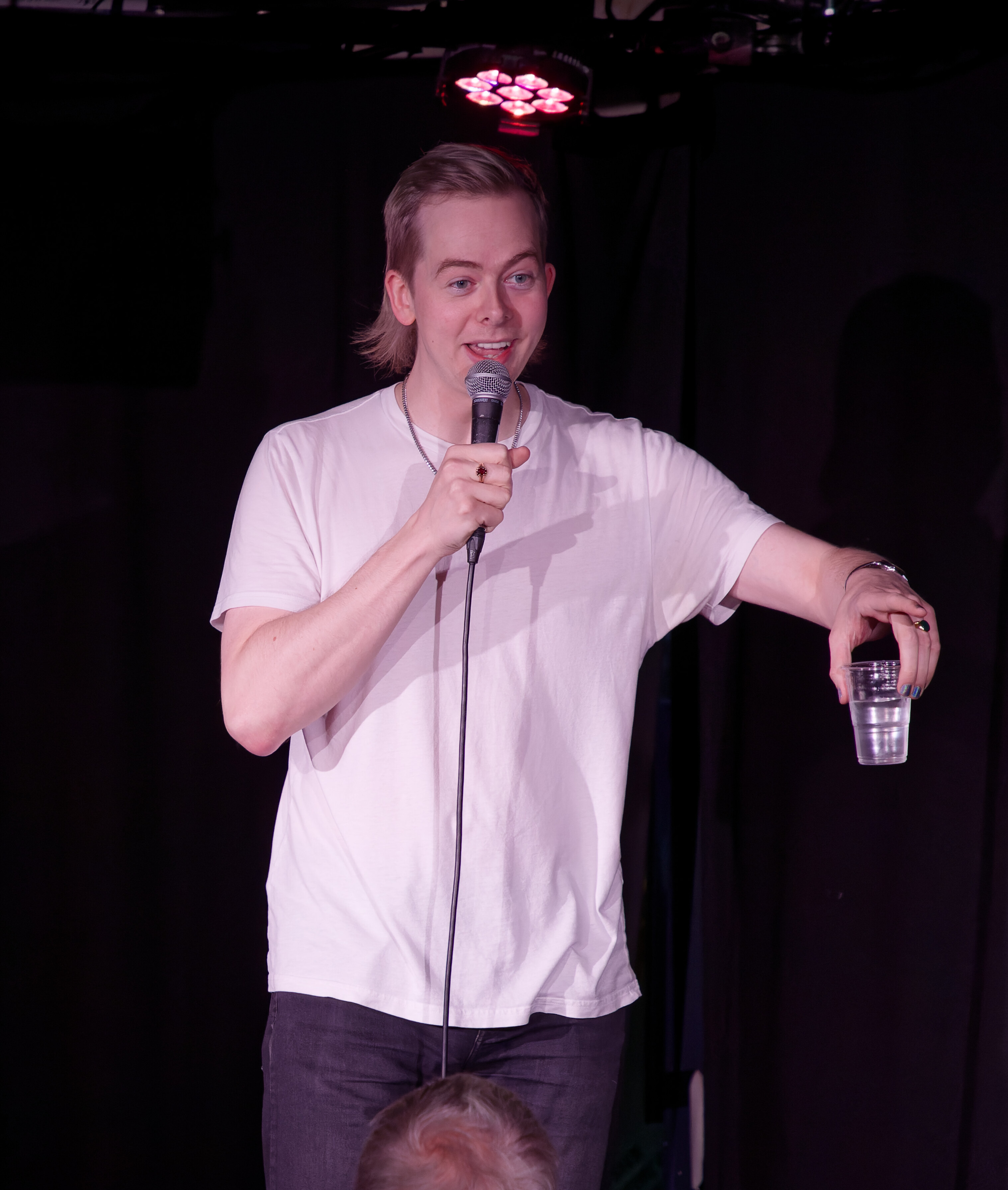
- Turner at the 2024 Edinburgh Festival Fringe
- Born: Christopher Peter Joseph Turner; 12 September 1989 (age 36); Manchester, England
- Citizenship: United Kingdom (by birthplace); United States (naturalized)
- Education: St Hugh's College, Oxford
- Years active: 2009–present
- Spouse: Alice Winn
- Children: 1
- Website: www.christurnercomedy.com

Christopher Peter Joseph Turner (born 12 September 1989) is a British and American comedian known for his improvisational freestyle rapping that ties together disparate topics suggested by his audience. In 2025, Turner was featured on the twentieth season of America's Got Talent where he finished in second place.

== Early life ==
Turner was born in Manchester. He attended Manchester Grammar School. He graduated with a Bachelor of Arts (BA) in Archaeology and Anthropology from St Hugh's College, Oxford.

Turner took up rapping as a teenager after he was diagnosed with Marfan syndrome, a condition of the body's connective tissue which made it hazardous for him to play sports.

However, in February 2018 Turner posted a letter on Facebook that he had received from the Manchester Centre for Genomic Medicine which said "all measurements from your echocardiogram (especially looking at your aorta) are entirely normal" and "this can confidently reassure you that you are not affected by Marfan syndrome".

== Career ==
Turner is an established presence at the Edinburgh Festival Fringe, has performed on The Late Show with Stephen Colbert, and worked with Cirque du Soleil in Las Vegas. While a student, he made it to the finals of the BBC Radio New Comedy Awards in 2011. Turner also does improv, having performed with the Oxford Imps in college and co-founding of Racing Minds, a British performance troupe. He was awarded first place in the Comedy/Novelty category of the 2024 International Songwriting Competition with the song "80s Kid".

=== America's Got Talent ===
In 2025, Turner auditioned for the twentieth season of the NBC talent show America's Got Talent, performing freestyle rap. All four of the show's judges (Simon Cowell, Sofía Vergara, Mel B, and Howie Mandel) voted "yes" for Turner to enter the competition. He subsequently advanced to the live shows, and, during the quarterfinals, performed his act by freestyle rapping from social media topic requests sent in shortly before his act. He advanced to the semifinals where he performed his act by rapping to random audience objects. After his performance, Cowell stated that it was "absolutely brilliant. Brilliant. Brilliant. Brilliant." Turner advanced to the finale of the show where he performed a freestyle of audience and judge suggestions, with the backing track gradually speeding up as the performance went on. Mel B stated that she was "lost for words" and had "never seen such raw talent" following his performance. Turner finished as the runner-up of the season, behind winner Jessica Sanchez.

== Personal life ==
Turner is married to novelist Alice Winn, whom he met at an improv group in Britain and started comedy to impress. They have one daughter and a cat named Colonel Widdershins, whose name is a reference to a term for counterclockwise.

During his America's Got Talent audition in 2025, Turner revealed that he had recently acquired American citizenship. He is currently residing in New York City.
