= ComicView: Rooftop Series =

American stand-up comedy TV show

- Genre: Stand-up comedy
- Directed by: Mr. I Am Standup
- Presented by: Chris Powell
- Starring: Trey Elliot; Ocean Glapion; "DJ R-Tistic" Ron Turner
- Country of origin: United States
- Original language: English
- No. of series: 1
- No. of episodes: 10

Production
- Executive producer: Jeru Tillman
- Producer: Royale Watkins
- Production company: Southfield Village Entertainment

Original release
- Network: BET
- Release: June 30, 2026 – present

Related
- ComicView

ComicView: Rooftop Series is an American stand-up comedy series that premiered on June 30, 2026, on BET. The series is hosted by Chris Powell. It is a revival of ComicView.

== Episodes ==
No.	Title	Original release date	U.S. viewers (millions)
1	"Kelly Kellz, Learnmore Jonasi & Shuler King"	June 30, 2026	N/A
Special Guest: Durand Bernarr
2	"Sydney Castillo, Kalea McNeil & Tony Roberts"	July 7, 2026	N/A
3	"Skeet Carter, Michael Turner & Dominique"	July 14, 2026	N/A
Special Guests: Diarra Kilpatrick, Shannon Wallace
4	"Ryan Davis, Precious Hall & Berry Brewer"	July 21, 2026	N/A
Special Guest: KevOnStage
5	"Leonard Ouzts, Sweet Baby Kita & Kevin Tate"	July 28, 2026	N/A
6	"Darius Bennett, Amir K & Correy Bell"	August 4, 2026	N/A
Special Guest: Brandon T. Jackson
7	"Tacarra, Darren Fleet & D'Lai"	August 11, 2026	N/A
8	"Mario Hodge, T Barb & Lance Woods"	August 18, 2026	TBD
Special Guest: Spectacular Smith
9	"Ocean Glapion, Just Nesh & Henry Coleman"	August 25, 2026	TBD
Special Guest: DJ Hed
10	"Ian Lara, Cousin Tiera & Blaq Ron"	September 1, 2026	TBD
Special Guest: Yo-Yo
