= Pranysqa Mishra =

- Born: 2014 (age 11–12); New Jersey, United States
- Occupations: Singer; songwriter
- Instrument: Vocals
- Years active: 2023–present
- Website: singwithpranysqa.com

Pranysqa Mishra (born 2014) is an American-Canadian child singer. She gained national recognition on America's Got Talent (Season 19) after receiving the Golden Buzzer from judge Heidi Klum for her performance of "River Deep – Mountain High" by Tina Turner. She has also performed the national anthem at major sporting events.

== Background ==
Mishra was born in New Jersey to Indian parents. Her father, a software engineer, has roots in West Bengal and lived in Chennai before moving to the United States, while her mother is from Delhi. Later, the family moved to Toronto, Canada, before moving to Florida. Mishra was interested in music from a young age, and her parents enrolling her in piano lessons and encouraged her to perform in local communities starting at the age of five.

Her musical influences include artists such as Aretha Franklin, Tina Turner, and Whitney Houston. Mishra watched online tutorials to learn songs on her own. A video of her singing Sia's "Cheap Thrills" at the age of two years and nine months was captured by her father on his YouTube channel.

The song "How Far I'll Go" from the Disney movie Moana inspired Mishra. After hearing the song, she started rehearsing it constantly, which led to her participation in singing competitions and community events. By the summer of 2020, Mishra participated in the Tailgate Talent Show in Toronto, where she was the youngest contestant to sing, write songs, and play piano. At just five years old, she performed "Into the Unknown" from Frozen 2 on stage in front of an audience of a few hundred people.

== Career ==
=== America's Got Talent ===
In 2024, Mishra auditioned for the nineteenth season of America's Got Talent. Her audition aired on July 5, 2024, when she performed "River Deep Mountain high" by Tina Turner and received the golden buzzer from judge Heidi Klum, sending her directly to the live shows. During the quarterfinals, Mishra performed "Wrecking Ball" by Miley Cyrus. Judge Howie Mandel praised her performance, calling her a "superstar in the making". In the semifinals, Mishra performed "High Hopes" by Panic! At The Disco. Her performance was widely praised, with Judge Klum calling her a "powerhouse" and Mandel calling her a "prodigy".

Week	Song Choice	Original Artist	Result
Audition	"River Deep – Mountain High"	Tina Turner	Golden Buzzer from Heidi Klum
Quarterfinals	"Wrecking Ball"	Miley Cyrus	Advanced
Semifinals	"High Hopes"	Panic! at the Disco	Eliminated

=== National anthem performances ===
Mishra has performed "The Star Spangled Banner" at various sporting events across the United States. She performed it at the 2023 US Open on opening night at Arthur Ashe Stadium in New York. She has also sung it for NBA, NHL, MLB, and NFL games. She also performed live on FOX Square during a special 9/11 memorial event.

She won the child category at Apollo's Amateur Night on the Apollo Theater stage in New York.
