= Alice Winn =

Irish-American novelist (born 1992)

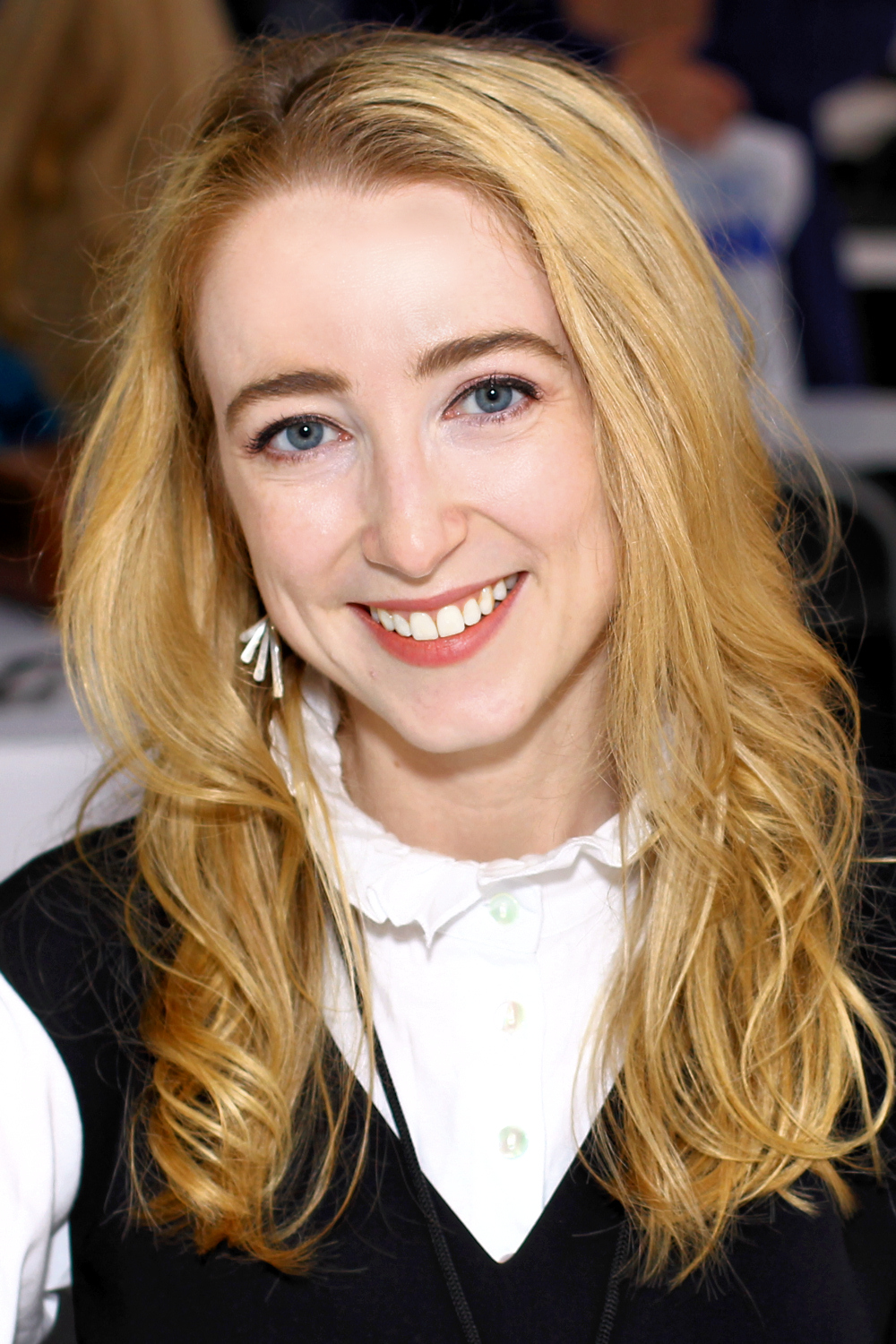
- Winn in 2023
- Born: Alice Mary Felicity Winn; 20 December 1992 (age 33); Paris, France
- Education: Marlborough College; St Peter's College, Oxford
- Occupations: Novelist and screenwriter
- Notable work: In Memoriam (2023)
- Spouse: Chris Turner
- Children: 1
- Awards: Waterstones Debut Fiction Prize
- Website: alicewinn.com

Alice Mary Felicity Winn (born 20 December 1992) is an Irish and American novelist and screenwriter, born in France and educated in England. She won the 2023 Waterstones Debut Fiction Prize for her novel In Memoriam.

== Early life and education ==
Winn was born and raised in Paris, France, the daughter of Irish and American parents. She holds Irish citizenship. She has dyslexia and did not learn to read until she was nine years old. Winn was educated at Marlborough College in England. She graduated with a degree in English literature from St Peter's College, Oxford. She has described having a "tenuous grasp" of her identity.

== Career ==
After graduating, Winn set a goal of writing "a novel a year until I wrote one that was good." Before writing In Memoriam, Winn wrote three unpublished novels, worked on screenplays, and taught homeschooled children.

In 2019, Winn started writing In Memoriam after reading student newspapers published 1913–1919 from her alma mater, Marlborough College. The protagonists, Gaunt and Ellwood, were inspired by her readings of and about Robert Graves and Siegfried Sassoon, respectively.

In 2025, she interviewed the writer Dan Jones at the Edinburgh Book Festival.

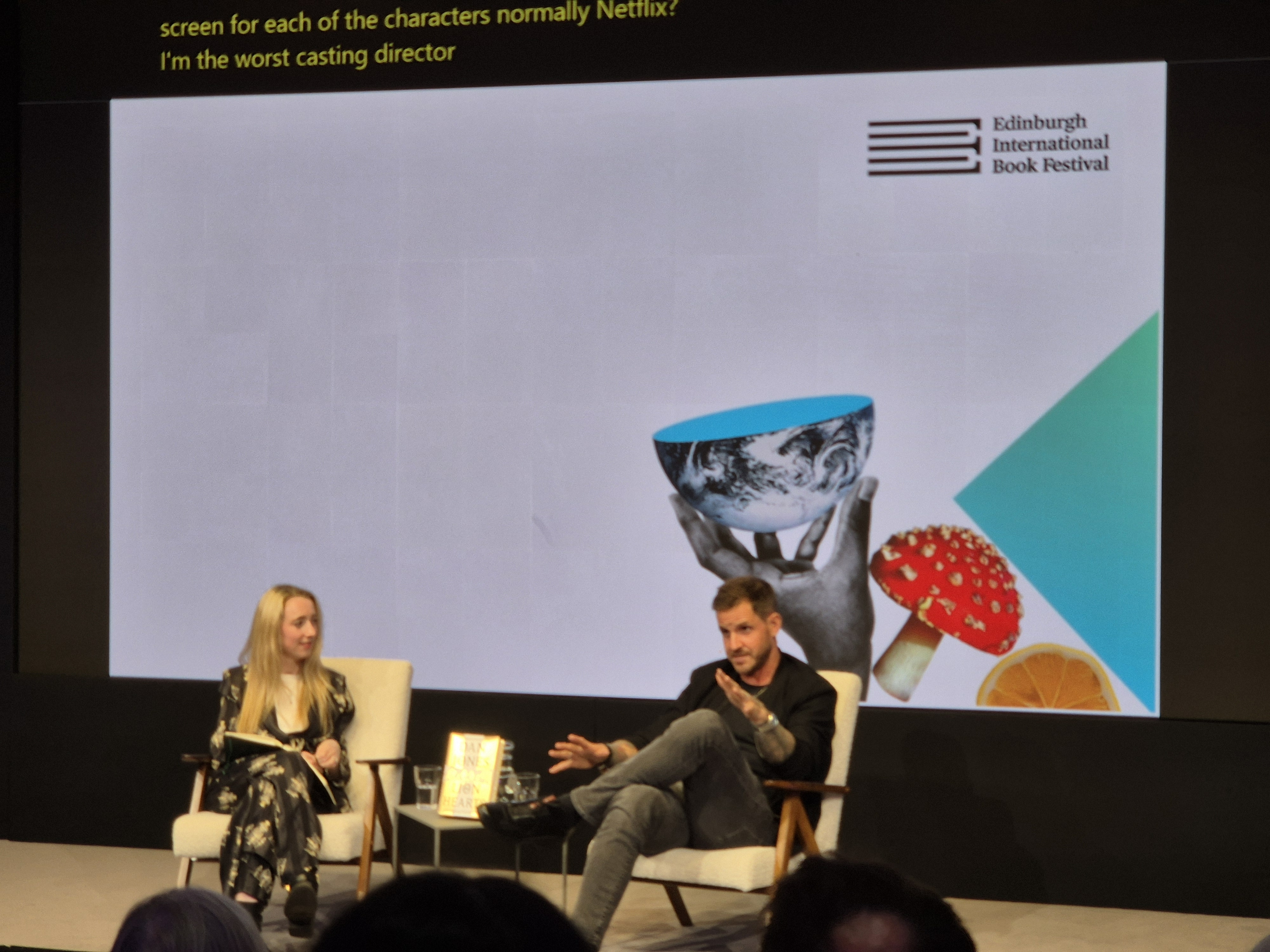
Winn interviewing Dan Jones at the 2025 Edinburgh Book Festival

== Personal life ==
Winn lives in Brooklyn, New York. Her husband, Chris Turner, is a British and American comedian, and they have a daughter together.

== Awards and honors ==
In 2023, Winn won the Waterstones Debut Fiction Prize and the British Book Awards Debut Book of the Year for In Memoriam. The book was also nominated for the 2023 Waterstones Book of the Year and won the Waterstones Novel of the Year. In October 2024, the German translation (Durch das große Feuer) won the Young Adult Jury Award of the German Youth Literature Awards at the Frankfurt Book Fair.

== Publications ==
- In Memoriam. Alfred A. Knopf. 2023. ISBN 9780593534564.
