= America's Got Talent season 20 =

America's Got Talent
- Season 20
- Promotional poster for season 20, featuring (L to R) host Crews and judges Vergara, Cowell, Mandel, and Mel B
- Hosted by: Terry Crews
- Judges: Howie Mandel; Mel B; Sofía Vergara; Simon Cowell
- Winner: Jessica Sanchez
- Runner-up: Chris Turner
- Finals venue: Pasadena Civic Auditorium
- No. of episodes: 24

Release
- Original network: NBC
- Original release: May 27 – September 24, 2025

Season chronology
- ← Previous; Season 19 Next → Season 21

Judges and Host for America's Got Talent Season 20

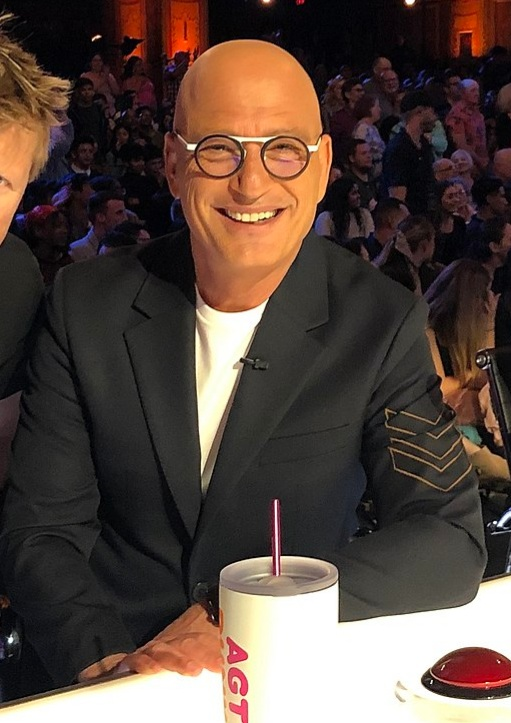
Howie Mandel

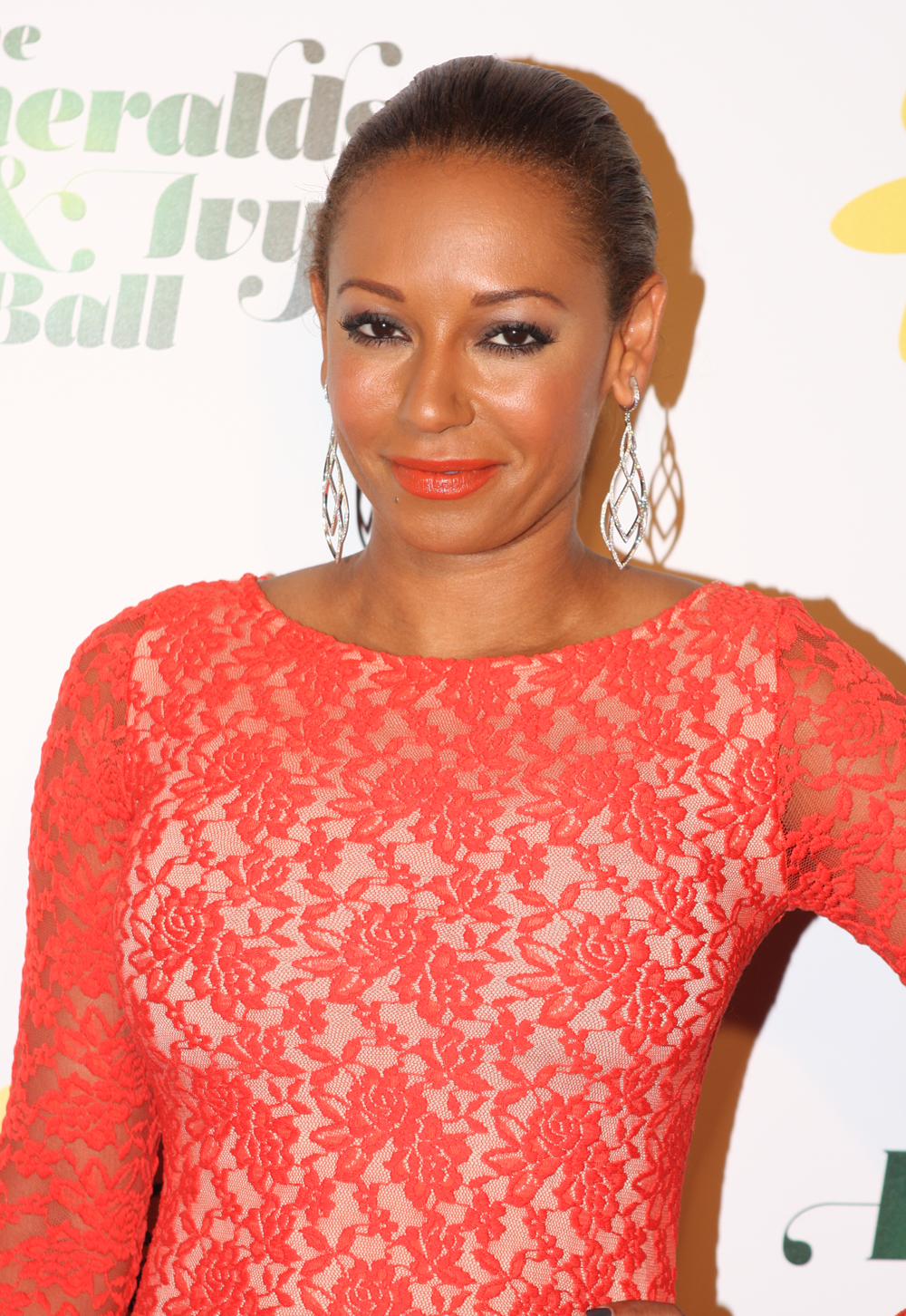
Mel B

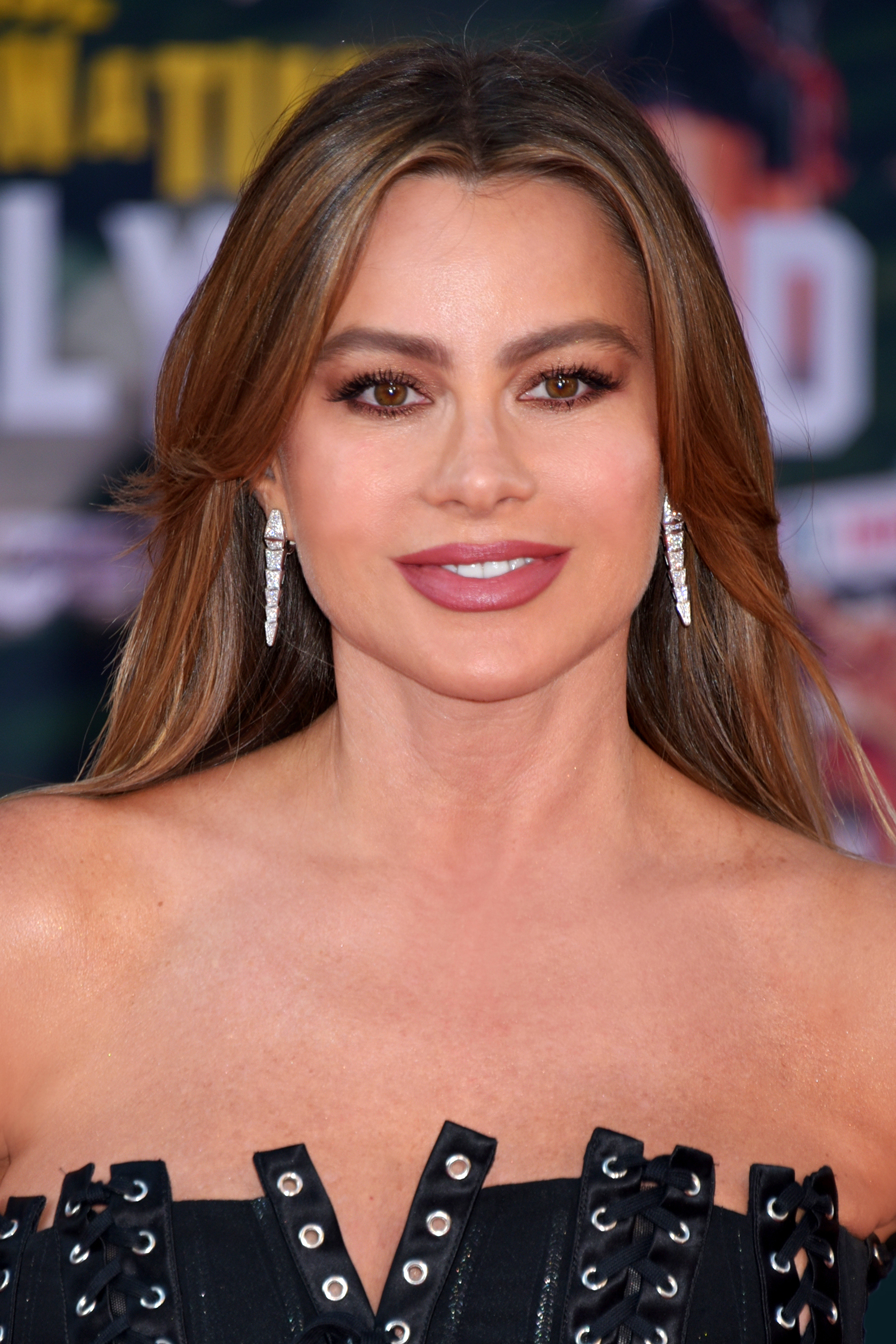
Sofía Vergara

Simon Cowell

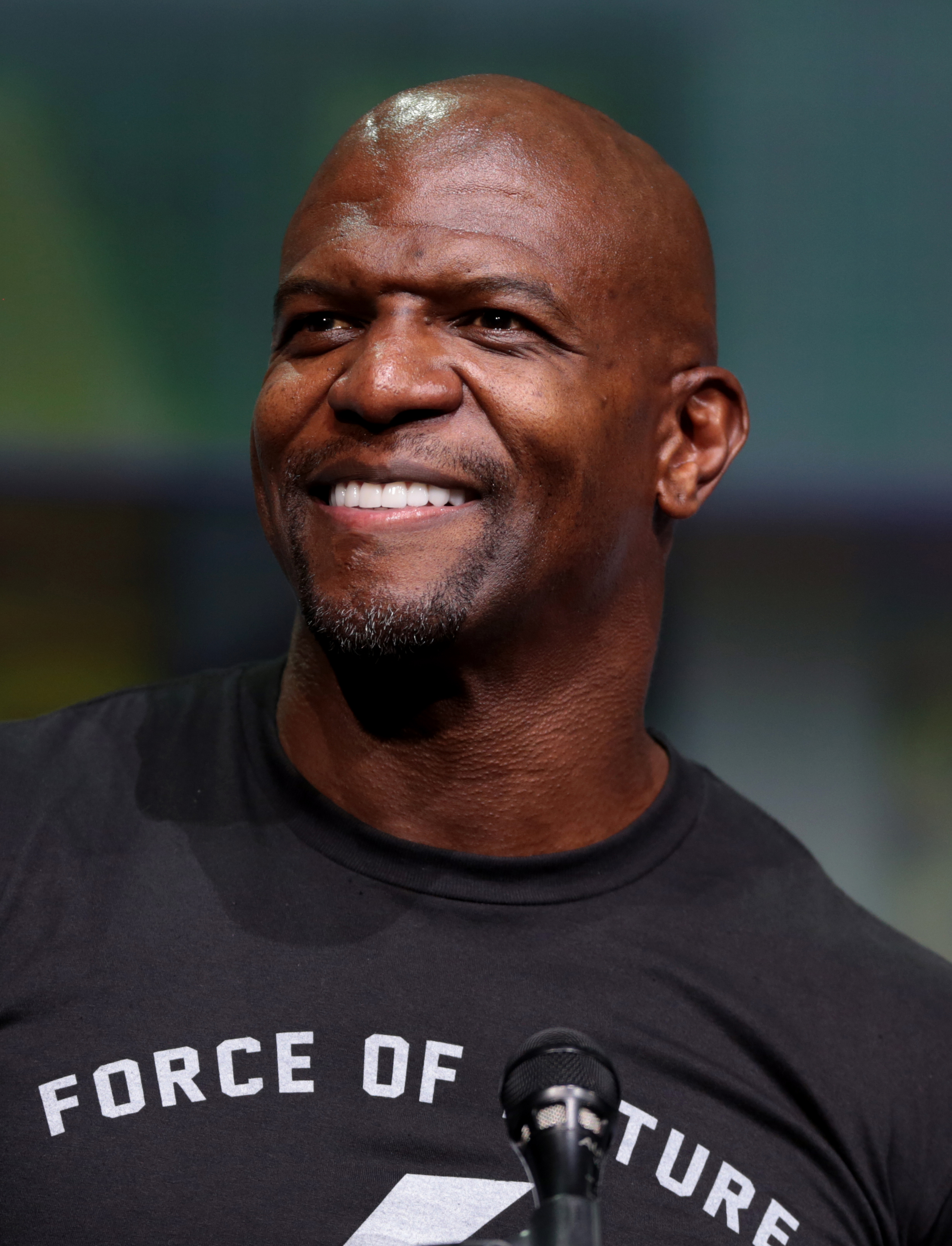
Terry Crews

The twentieth season of the American talent show competition series America's Got Talent premiered on NBC on May 27, 2025, and concluded on September 24, 2025. Howie Mandel, Sofía Vergara, and Simon Cowell all returned to the panel for their sixteenth, sixth, and tenth respective seasons. Mel B returned to the panel for her seventh season after a six-season hiatus, replacing Heidi Klum. Terry Crews returned as host for his seventh consecutive season.

The season was won by singer Jessica Sanchez, who previously competed on the show's inaugural season in 2006. Freestyle rapper Chris Turner and singer Jourdan Blue finished in second and third place, respectively. This season averaged around 4.49 million viewers per broadcast.

== Production ==
On January 8, 2025, it was announced that open-call auditions for the upcoming season had been postponed until further notice due to the ongoing wildfires in Southern California, where the show is filmed. Filming of the televised auditions commenced at the Pasadena Civic Auditorium on March 14, 2025.

== Season overview ==
For the second time in the show's history, each judge was able to give two Golden Buzzers instead of the usual one and each judge was able to give out one Golden Buzzer during the quarter-finals; host Terry Crews also received two Golden Buzzers to give out during the auditions. For the first time in the show's history, a Golden Buzzer was originally slated for the semi-final episode. This was later scrapped, following the withdrawal of a semifinalist.

Choir instructor Astrid Jorgensen was originally announced as one of the top 44 acts for the live shows. For unknown reasons, Jorgensen was later withdrawn from the live shows and replaced by bodybuilder Mike Munz. During the Quarterfinals 4 results show on September 10, Terry Crews announced that Mastermind, who advanced to the Semifinals the previous week, had to withdraw from the competition for personal reasons.

Winner | Runner-up | Third place | Finalist | Semi-finalist | Quarter-finalist | Withdrawn
Golden Buzzer | Live Golden Buzzer

Participant	Age(s)	Genre	Act	From	Quarter-Final	Result
Alain Simonov	24	Magic	Magician	Brazil	2	Eliminated
Alex Zinger & Crew	—	Dance	Dance Group	Brooklyn, New York	2	Eliminated
Anna Saranina	41	Danger	Crossbow Shooter	Las Vegas, Nevada	3	Eliminated
Austin Brown	38	Singing	Singer	Nashville, Tennessee	3	Eliminated
B Unique Crew	21–30	Dance	Dance Group	Jodhpur, India	1	Eliminated
Bay Melnick Virgolino	10	Singing / Music	Singer & Guitarist	New York	2	Semi-finalist
Benjamin Hightower	30	Singing / Music	Singer & Pianist	Tennessee	2	Eliminated
Benn Family Band	—	Singing	Vocal Group	Altadena, California	3	Eliminated
Birmingham Youth Fellowship Choir	-	Singing	Choir	Birmingham, Alabama	4	Semi-finalist
Boston Dynamics	—	Dance	Robot Dance Act	Boston, Massachusetts	2	Eliminated
Charity Lockhart	49	Singing	Singer	Cleveland, Ohio	1	Eliminated
Chris Turner	35	Singing	Freestyle Rapper	Manchester, United Kingdom	3	Runner-up
Chuck Adams	40	Singing / Music	Singer & Guitarist	Nashville, Tennessee	4	Eliminated
CitiLimitz	20-21	Singing	Vocal Trio	Chattanooga, Tennessee	1	Eliminated
Cole Swensen & Judy	—	Singing / Music	Singer, Guitarist and Cellist	Hollywood, California	4	Eliminated
Crash Adams	—	Singing	Vocal Duo	Toronto, Canada	4	Eliminated
Duo Stardust	26 & 28	Danger	Rollerskating Duo	Ukraine	2	Eliminated
EDT Dance Team	—	Dance / Acrobatics	Cheerleading Group	New Orleans, Louisiana	2	Eliminated
Gendai	—	Variety	Laser Act	Tokyo, Japan	4	Eliminated
Girish and the Chronicles	—	Singing / Music	Band	Bengaluru, India	3	Eliminated
Jacqueline & Wagner	—	Acrobatics	Aerial Duo	Italy & Brazil	3	Eliminated
Jessica Sanchez	29	Singing	Singer	Houston, Texas	3	Winner
Jonglissimo	38 & 42	Variety	Multimedia Juggling Group	Linz, Austria	2	Eliminated
Jourdan Blue	23	Singing	Singer	New Orleans, Louisiana	1	Third place
Leo High School Choir	—	Singing	Choir	Chicago, Illinois	2	Grand-finalist
Light Wire	—	Dance / Variety	Multimedia Group	São Paulo, Brazil	1	Grand-finalist
Loco Pop Familia	-	Dance	Dance Group	Tokyo, Japan	1	Eliminated
Maceo Harrison	30	Dance	Dancer	Savannah, Georgia	3	Eliminated
Mama Duke	—	Singing	Rapper	Austin, Texas	2	Finalist
Mastermind (Note: On October 10, 2025, Mastermind would reveal themself to be AGT season 12 semifinalist, Colin Cloud, in a video posted on Cloud's Instagram.)	—	Magic	Magician	—	3	Withdrawn
Messoudi Brothers	36	Variety	Juggling Duo	Australia	3	Eliminated
Micah Palace	23	Singing	Rapper	Connecticut	3	Finalist
Mike Munz	—	Variety	Bodybuilder	Plantation, Florida	4	Eliminated
Phobias	—	Magic	Horror Magic Trio	Rome, Sicily & Apulia	1	Eliminated
Shuler King	40	Comedy	Comedian	Charlotte, North Carolina	1	Eliminated
Sirca Marea	—	Acrobatics	Trapeze Duo	Argentina & Chile	1	Finalist
Steve Ray Ladson	35	Singing / Music	Singer & Musician	Hopkins, South Carolina	1	Finalist
Team Recycled	—	Dance	Dance Group	Berlin, Germany	4	Finalist
The BoykinZ	18-23	Singing	Vocal Group	Snellville, Georgia	4	Eliminated
The Funkateer Dancers	59-66	Dance	Dance Group	Inkster, Michigan	4	Eliminated
Tom Sandoval & the Most Extras	—	Singing / Music	Band	St. Louis, Hawaii & Germany	1	Eliminated
TT Boys	—	Acrobatics	Acrobatic Duo	Addis Ababa, Ethiopia	4	Semi-finalist
Unreal Crew	—	Dance	Dance Group	Jaipur, India	2	Semi-finalist
Zak Mirz	—	Magic	Magician	Dallas, Texas	4	Semi-finalist

=== Quarter-finals summary ===
Buzzed Out | Live Golden Buzzer | Advanced to Finals | Advanced to Semifinals | Eliminated (Top 5)

==== Quarter-final 1 (August 19) ====
Guest Performer, Results Show: Def Leppard

Participant	Order	Buzzes				Result (August 20)
Participant	Order	Cowell	Vergara	Mel B	Mandel	Result (August 20)
Light Wire	1					Advanced
Charity Lockhart	2					Eliminated
Phobias	3	Buzzed Out		Buzzed Out		Eliminated
CitiLimitz	4					Eliminated
Sirca Marea	5					Advanced
Steve Ray Ladson	6		Live Golden Buzzer			Advanced
Loco Pop Familia	7					Eliminated
Shuler King	8					Eliminated (Top 5)
Jourdan Blue	9					Advanced
B Unique Crew	10					Eliminated (Top 5)
Tom Sandoval & the Most Extras	11	Buzzed Out				Eliminated

==== Quarter-final 2 (August 26) ====
Guest Performer, Results Show: Flau'jae

Participant	Order	Buzzes				Result (August 27)
Participant	Order	Cowell	Vergara	Mel B	Mandel	Result (August 27)
EDT Dance Team	1					Eliminated
Mama Duke	2			Live Golden Buzzer		Advanced
Unreal Crew	3					Advanced
Alain Simonov	4			Buzzed Out		Eliminated
Leo High School Choir	5					Advanced
Jonglissimo	6					Eliminated (Top 5)
Benjamin Hightower	7					Eliminated
Duo Stardust	8					Eliminated (Top 5)
Boston Dynamics	9	Buzzed Out				Eliminated
Alex Zinger & Crew	10				Buzzed Out	Eliminated
Bay Melnick Virgolino	11					Advanced

==== Quarter-final 3 (September 2) ====
Guest Performers, Results Show: Lindsey Stirling & The Clairvoyants

Participant	Order	Buzzes				Result (September 3)
Participant	Order	Cowell	Vergara	Mel B	Mandel	Result (September 3)
Jacqueline & Wagner	1					Eliminated (Top 5)
Austin Brown	2					Eliminated
Maceo Harrison	3					Eliminated
Benn Family Band	4					Eliminated
Messoudi Brothers	5					Eliminated (Top 5)
Micah Palace	6	Live Golden Buzzer				Advanced
Mastermind	7					Advanced
Girish and the Chronicles	8					Eliminated
Anna Saranina	9					Eliminated
Chris Turner	10					Advanced
Jessica Sanchez	11					Advanced

==== Quarter-final 4 (September 9) ====
Guest Performer, Results Show: Le Sserafim

Participant	Order	Buzzes				Result (September 10)
Participant	Order	Cowell	Vergara	Mel B	Mandel	Result (September 10)
Crash Adams	1					Eliminated
Zak Mirz	2				^{1}	Advanced
TT Boys	3					Advanced
Cole Swensen & Judy	4					Eliminated
Mike Munz	5	Buzzed Out			Buzzed Out	Eliminated
Chuck Adams	6					Eliminated (Top 5)
The Funkateer Dancers	7					Eliminated (Top 5)
The BoykinZ	8					Eliminated
Gendai	9					Eliminated
Team Recycled	10				Live Golden Buzzer	Advanced
Birmingham Youth Fellowship Choir	11					Advanced

- ^1 Mandel originally buzzed Zak Mirz, but later retracted his buzzer at the conclusion of Mirz's performance.

=== Semi-finals summary ===
Advanced to Finals

==== Semi-final (September 16) ====
Guest Performer, Results Show: Solange Kardinaly

Participant	Order	Buzzes				Result (September 17)
Participant	Order	Cowell	Vergara	Mel B	Mandel	Result (September 17)
TT Boys	1					Eliminated
Zak Mirz	2					Eliminated
Birmingham Youth Fellowship Choir	3					Eliminated
Chris Turner	4					Advanced
Unreal Crew	5					Eliminated
Bay Melnick Virgolino	6					Eliminated
Sirca Marea	7					Advanced
Jessica Sanchez	8					Advanced
Leo High School Choir	9					Advanced
Light Wire	10					Advanced
Jourdan Blue	11					Advanced

=== Finals summary ===
Guest Performers, Results Show: Eric Lloyd, Richard Goodall, Neal Schon, and the cast of Now You See Me: Now You Don't (Mat Franco, Shin Lim, and Piff the Magic Dragon)

Winner | Runner-up | 3rd place | Top 5

Finalist	Performed with (2nd Performance)	Result
Chris Turner	Bozoma Saint John & Keely Watson	2nd
Jessica Sanchez	N/A ^{2}	1st
Jourdan Blue	Danny O'Donoghue	3rd
Leo High School Choir	Aloe Blacc	Grand-finalist
Light Wire	Leona Lewis	Grand-finalist
Mama Duke	Sainted	Finalist
Micah Palace	Manuel Turizo	Finalist
Sirca Marea	N/A ^{2}	Finalist
Steve Ray Ladson	N/A ^{3}	Finalist
Team Recycled	Ciara	Finalist

- ^2 Jessica Sanchez and Sirca Marea conducted a joint routine for their second performance.
- ^3 Steve Ray Ladson conducted a joint routine with Leo High School Choir for his second performance.

== Ratings ==
Viewership and ratings per episode of America's Got Talent season 20
No.	Title	Air date	Timeslot (ET)	Rating (18–49)	Viewers (millions)	Ref.
1	"Auditions 1"	May 27, 2025	Tuesday 8:00 p.m.	0.4	4.81	
2	"Auditions 2"	June 3, 2025	Tuesday 8:00 p.m.	0.5	4.69	
3	"Auditions 3"	June 10, 2025	Tuesday 8:00 p.m.	0.4	4.54	
4	"Auditions 4"	June 17, 2025	Tuesday 8:00 p.m.	0.3	4.58	
5	"Auditions 5"	June 24, 2025	Tuesday 8:00 p.m.	0.4	4.91	
6	"Auditions 6"	July 8, 2025	Tuesday 8:00 p.m.	0.4	4.90	
7	"Auditions 7"	July 15, 2025	Tuesday 8:00 p.m.	0.4	5.02	
8	"Greatest Golden Buzzers!"	July 22, 2025	Tuesday 8:00 p.m.	0.3	3.77	
9	"Auditions 8"	July 29, 2025	Tuesday 8:00 p.m.	0.5	4.91	
10	"Auditions 9"	August 5, 2025	Tuesday 8:00 p.m.	0.4	4.56	
11	"AGT 20th Birthday Party"	August 12, 2025	Tuesday 8:00 p.m.	0.3	3.99	
12	"Quarterfinals 1"	August 19, 2025	Tuesday 8:00 p.m.	0.3	4.64	
13	"Quarterfinals 1 Results"	August 20, 2025	Wednesday 8:00 p.m.	0.3	3.99	
14	"Quarterfinals 2"	August 26, 2025	Tuesday 8:00 p.m.	0.4	4.72	
15	"Quarterfinals 2 Results"	August 27, 2025	Wednesday 8:00 p.m.	0.3	3.85	
16	"Quarterfinals 3"	September 2, 2025	Tuesday 8:00 p.m.	0.4	4.78	
17	"Quarterfinals 3 Results"	September 3, 2025	Wednesday 8:00 p.m.	0.3	4.17	
18	"Quarterfinals 4"	September 9, 2025	Tuesday 8:00 p.m.	0.4	4.73	
19	"Quarterfinals 4 Results"	September 10, 2025	Wednesday 8:00 p.m.	0.3	4.12	
20	"Semifinals"	September 16, 2025	Tuesday 8:00 p.m.	0.4	4.33	
21	"Semifinals Results"	September 17, 2025	Wednesday 8:00 p.m.	0.3	4.58	
22	"Finale Performances"	September 23, 2025	Tuesday 9:00 p.m.	0.3	4.36	
23	"Countdown to the Finale"	September 24, 2025	Wednesday 8:00 p.m.	0.3	3.40	
24	"Finale Results"	September 24, 2025	Wednesday 9:00 p.m.	0.3	4.26	
