= Oscar Stembridge =

Swedish singer-songwriter (born 2007)

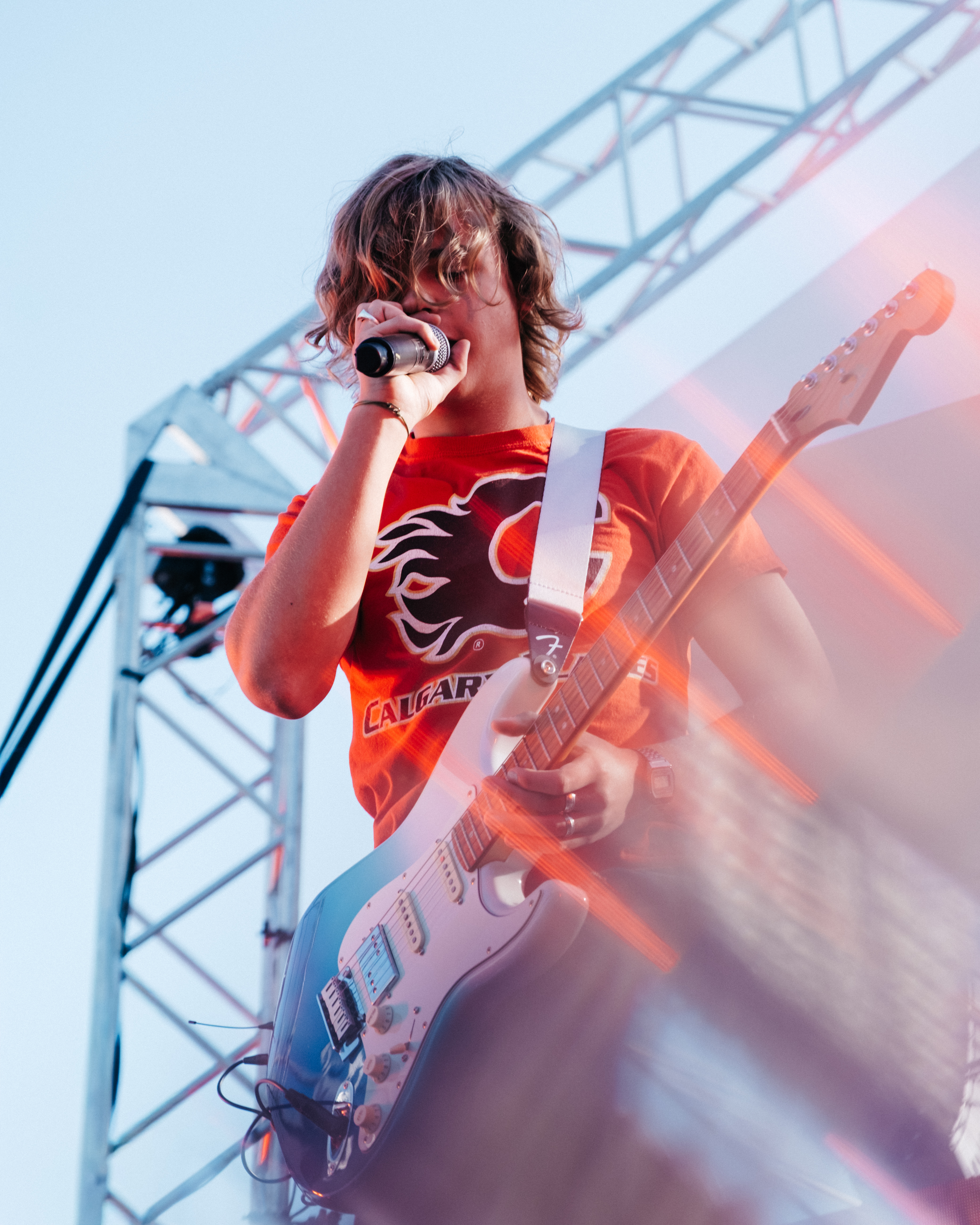
- Stembridge performing in 2025

Background information
- Born: 29 December 2007 (age 18); London, United Kingdom
- Origin: Malmö, Sweden
- Genres: Indie pop
- Occupations: Musician; songwriter; actor
- Instruments: Vocals; guitar; piano; drums; bass
- Years active: 2019–present
- Awards: Rookie of the Year, 2022 DennizPop Awards
- Website: oscarstembridge.com

Oscar Stembridge (born 29 December 2007) is a Swedish singer-songwriter, multi-instrumentalist, and actor.

== Life and career ==
Oscar Stembridge is a self-taught Swedish singer and multi-instrumentalist. He plays guitar, piano, drums, and bass. He began by recording himself playing cover songs by artists such as Queen, Guns N' Roses, Ed Sheeran, Avicii, and Shawn Mendes, which he posted on social media. At the age of ten, he was the youngest person to ever sign a recording contract with Universal Music Sweden. In 2019, when he was 11 years old, he was invited to perform on the live televised music program Allsång på Skansen—being the youngest musician to ever do so. The same year, he released his first original single, titled "Losing You".

In 2020, he was invited to perform for the Crown Princess Victoria on her birthday, and he played the Journey song "Don't Stop Believin'" at an event that included performances by the Mamas, Linnea Henriksson, Petra Marklund, and Anne Sofie von Otter.

Stembridge has also taken on acting roles on television. In 2020, he landed the lead male role on the SVT musical series Kär, alongside Eva Jumatate. In 2022, he appeared in the SVT series Up4Noise 3.

In 2022, Stembridge independently released his debut EP, THIR13EN. Later that year, he won the Rookie Artist of the Year at the DennizPop Awards in Stockholm, from a jury that included Max Martin.

In 2024, he appeared on the 19th season of America's Got Talent, only the second Swede to do so in the show's history. Stembridge reached the quarter-finals, performing his own original songs.

In 2025, Stembridge independently released his sophomore EP, How Did We End Up Here?

== Discography ==
EPs

- THIR13EN (2022)
- How Did We End Up Here? (2025)

Singles

- "Hold My Hand" (2018)
- "Train" (2018)
- "Losing You" (2019)
- "Hold on Me" (2019)
- "We March" (2019)
- "Sleepless" (2019)
- "Too Much" (2020)
- "Where Are You Now?" (2020)
- "WOW" (2020)
- "These Days" (2021)
- "Don't Lie to Me" (2022)
- "Am I the Only One" (2022)
- "Young Ones" (2022)
- "Fake Front" (2022)
- "What If" (2024)
- "Happy Xmas (War Is Over)" feat CHILI (2024)
- "Little Bird" (2025)
- "Dead Man Walking" (2025)
- "How Did We End Up Here?" (2025)
- "Hold Me Till It's Over" (2026)
- "Are We There Yet" (2026)
- "See You in the Summer" (2026)
