= Richard Goodall =

American singer and janitor

- Born: Richard Goodall; Indianapolis, Indiana, U.S.
- Occupations: Singer, janitor
- Years active: 2024–present
- Known for: America's Got Talent season 19 winner

Richard Goodall is an American singer. He is best known as the winner of season 19 of America's Got Talent in 2024. He was the first singer in five years to win the show and received a golden buzzer in the first round from Heidi Klum.

== Background ==
Goodall lives in Terre Haute, Indiana, where he has worked as a school janitor with the Vigo County School Corporation for 23 years. Often singing to amuse himself while on the job, a video of him performing "Don't Stop Believin'" by Journey to the students went viral online in 2022. News outlets such as Fox News and ABC News shared the clip in 2022.

== Career ==
=== 2024: America's Got Talent ===
In 2024, Goodall auditioned for the nineteenth season of America's Got Talent. His audition aired on May 28, 2024. His performance received widespread acclaim from the public and judges and judge Simon Cowell called Goodall his "hero". Judge Heidi Klum gave him a golden buzzer, sending him directly to the live shows. His audition had over 42 million views on the show's official YouTube channel. His next performance was in the first live show of the season, singing Michael Bolton's "How Am I Supposed to Live Without You". Goodall dedicated the performance to his fiancé, Angie Vanoven. In the semifinals, he sang Survivor's "Eye of the Tiger". Advancing to the finals, Goodall sang "Faithfully" by Journey. In the finale, Neal Schon and other members of Journey performed with Goodall; they sang his audition song, "Don't Stop Believin'".

==== Performances and results ====
Week	Song choice	Original artist	Result
Audition	"Don't Stop Believin'"	Journey	Golden Buzzer from judge Heidi Klum
Quarterfinals	"How Am I Supposed to Live Without You"	Michael Bolton	Advanced
Semifinals	"Eye of the Tiger"	Survivor	Advanced
Finals	"Faithfully"	Journey	N/A
Finale	"Don't Stop Believin'" ft. Neal Schon and Journey	Journey	Winner

=== 2025–present: "Long Time Coming" ===
On August 29, 2025, Goodall released his debut single "Long Time Coming". He performed the song live on September 24, 2025, during the season finale of season 20 of America's Got Talent.

== Personal life ==
Goodall married his fiancé, Angie Vanoven, in Pasadena, California on September 18, 2024, six days before he was announced the winner of season 19 of America's Got Talent.

== Discography ==
=== Singles ===
List of singles, showing year released, and the name of the album
Title	Year	Album
"Long Time Coming"	2025	TBA
“Fight For Love”	2026	TBA
