= America's Got Talent season 19 =

America's Got Talent
- Season 19
- Promotional poster for season 19, featuring (L to R) host Crews and judges Klum, Cowell, Vergara, and Mandel
- Showrunners: Jason Raff; Sam Donnelly
- Hosted by: Terry Crews
- Judges: Howie Mandel; Heidi Klum; Sofía Vergara; Simon Cowell
- Winner: Richard Goodall
- Runners-up: Roni Sagi & Rhythm
- Finals venue: Pasadena Civic Auditorium
- No. of episodes: 21

Release
- Original network: NBC
- Original release: May 28 – September 24, 2024

Season chronology
- ← Previous; Season 18 Next → Season 20

Judges and Host for America's Got Talent Season 19

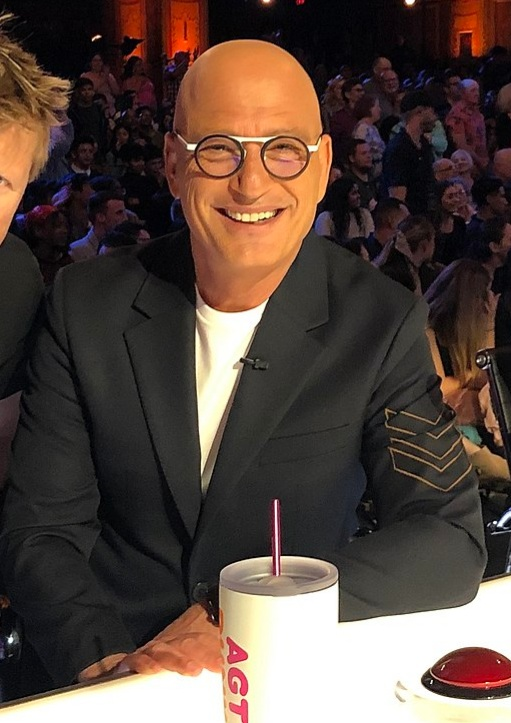
Howie Mandel

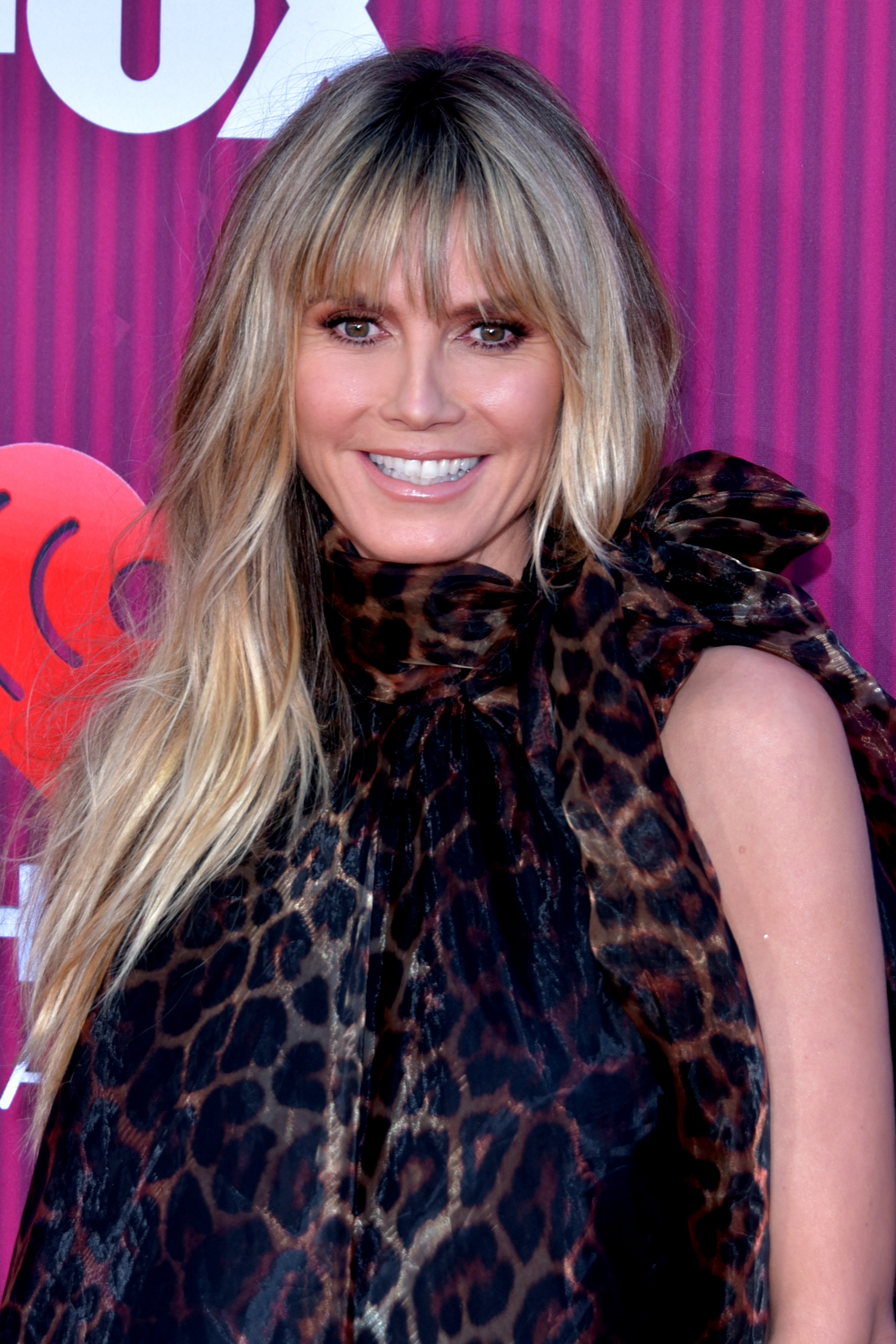
Heidi Klum

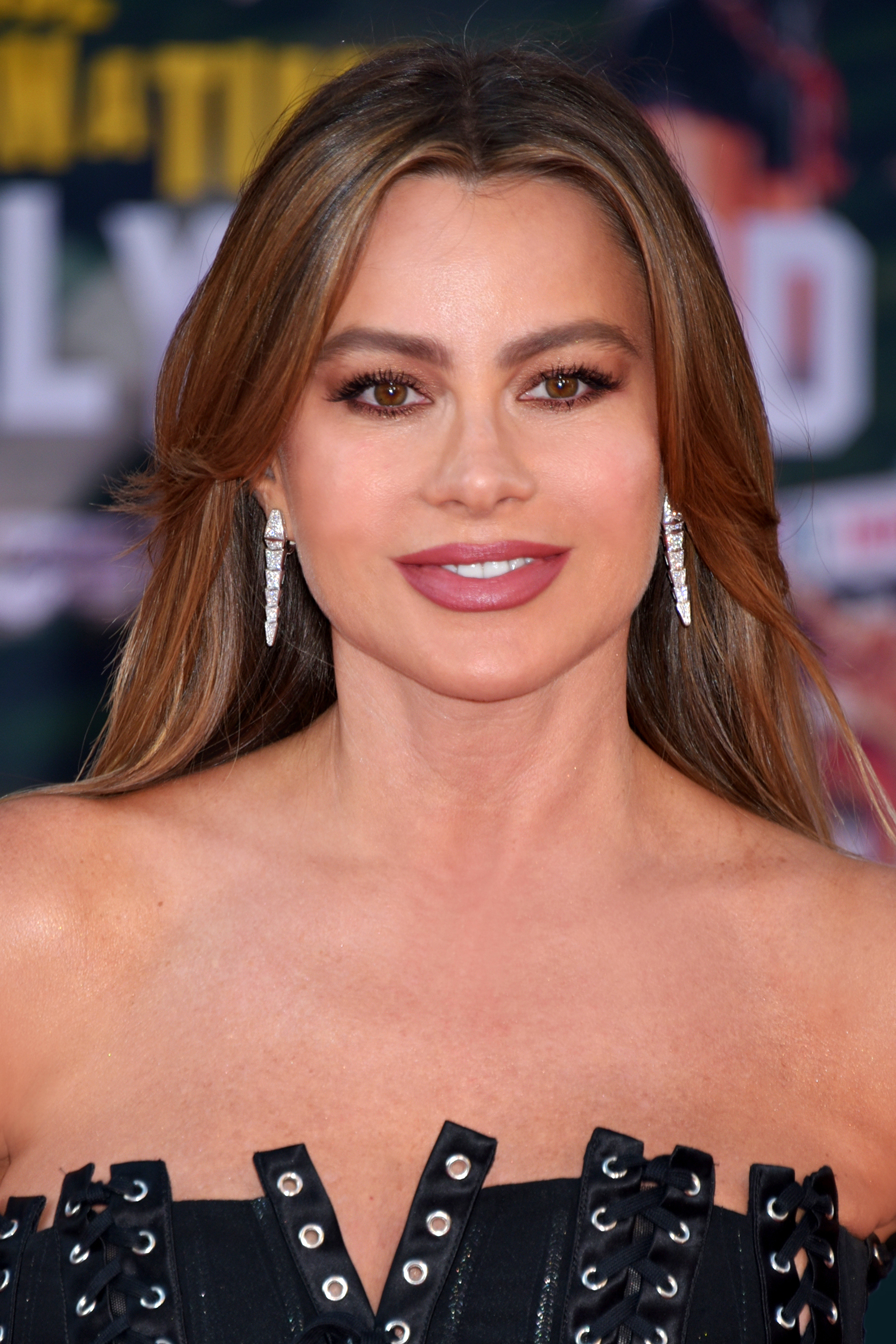
Sofía Vergara

Simon Cowell

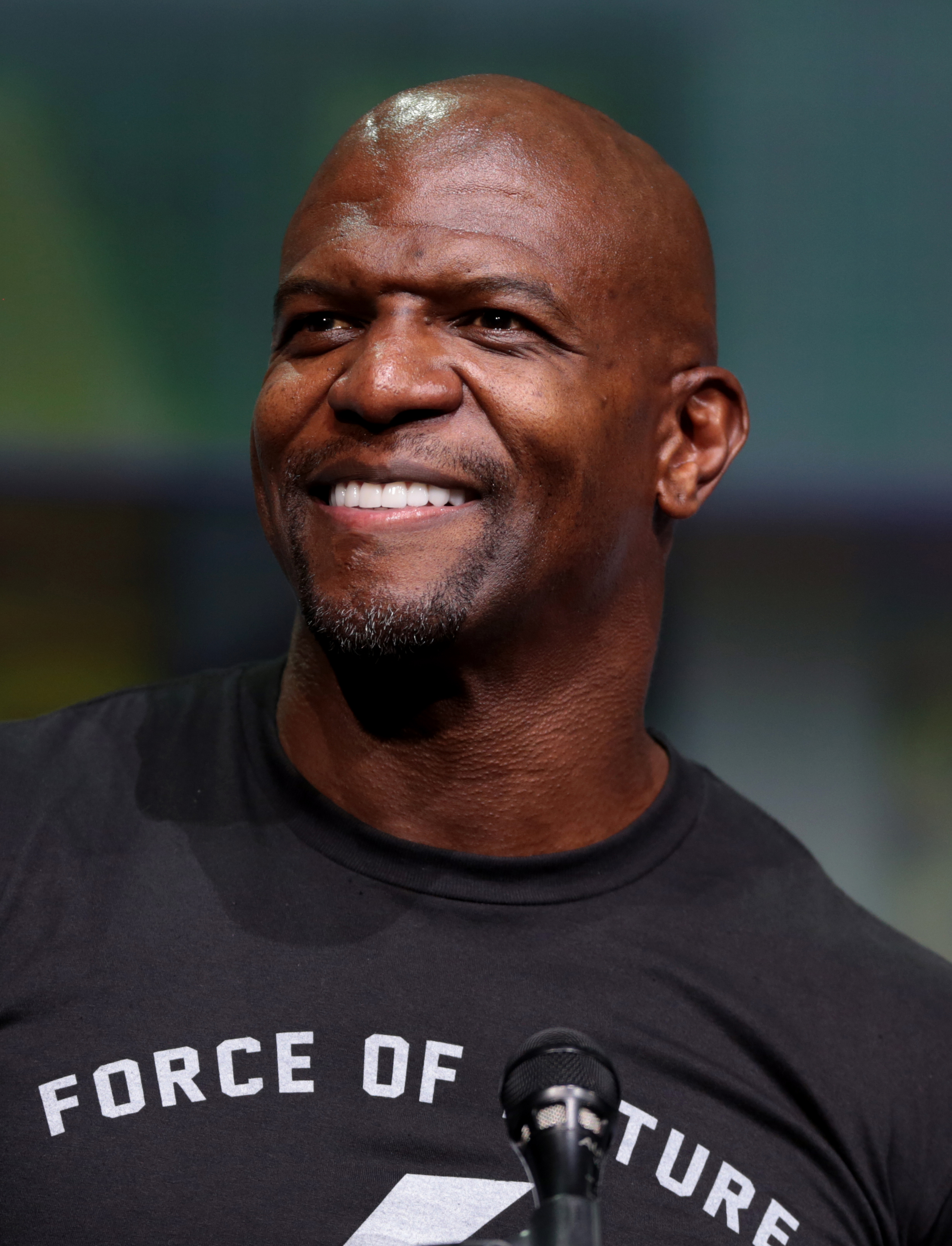
Terry Crews

The nineteenth season of the American talent show competition series America's Got Talent premiered on NBC on May 28, 2024. Howie Mandel, Heidi Klum, Sofía Vergara, and Simon Cowell all returned to the panel for their fifteenth, eleventh, fifth, and ninth respective seasons. Terry Crews returned as host for his sixth consecutive season.

The season was won by singer Richard Goodall, with dog tricks act Roni Sagi & Rhythm finishing second, and drone precision group Sky Elements placing third. This season averaged around 4.78 million viewers per broadcast.

== Production ==
During the finale of the previous season, it was announced that the entire main cast would return for the new season marking the fifth consecutive year the judging panel and host would remain the same. Filming of the auditions again happened at the Pasadena Civic Auditorium in March and April 2024.

Sonic Drive-In ended its sponsorship with the series, having been its sponsor for the last three seasons before the start of this season. The current sponsor was revealed to be Lavazza as featured in the end credits and on all of the judge's cups during the live shows.

A two-week hiatus in the broadcast schedule was also made, to avoid the NBC's live coverage of the 2024 Summer Olympics between July and August.

== Season overview ==
For the first time in the show's history, each judge was able to give two Golden Buzzers instead of the usual one. However, host Crews still only received one to give out. Furthermore, each judge was able to give out one Golden Buzzer during the live shows, making the first time on the American version of Got Talent.

Winner | Runner-up | Third place | Finalist | Semi-finalist | Quarter-finalist | Golden Buzzer | Live Golden Buzzer

Participant	Age(s)	Genre	Act	From	Quarter-Final	Result
AIRFOOTWORKS	24-37	Dance	Dance Group	Japan	2	Finalist
Alex Sampson	20	Singing	Singer	Atikokan, Ontario	2	Semi-finalist
Arshiya	13	Acrobatics	Contortionist	Kashmir, India	1	Eliminated
Ashes & Arrows	29–32	Singing / Music	Band	Asheville, North Carolina	1	Semi-finalist
Ashlee Montague	43	Acrobatics	Extreme Ballerina	New York City/was Washington	2	Eliminated
Attraction Juniors	8–15	Dance	Shadow Dance Group	Budapest, Hungary	1	Eliminated
Bboy Samuka	26	Dance	Dancer	Brazil	2	Eliminated
Biko's Manna	9–17	Singing / Music	Band	Johannesburg, South Africa	2	Eliminated
Brent Street	15–20	Dance	Dance Group	Sydney, Australia	4	Finalist
Brooke Bailey	19	Singing	Singer	Granada Hills, Los Angeles	2	Eliminated
Dee Dee Simon	45	Singing	Singer	Oakland, California	3	Finalist
Erica Rhodes	41	Comedy	Comedian	Boston	4	Eliminated
Flewnt & Inkabee	29 & 11	Singing	Rap Duo	Perth, Australia	1	Eliminated
Hakuna Matata Acrobats	23-37	Acrobatics	Acrobatic Group	Dar es Salaam, Tanzania	1	Finalist
Hypers Kids Africa	7–15	Dance	Dance Group	Kampala, Uganda	1	Eliminated
Illya & Anastasia Strakhov	47 & 37	Acrobatics	Balancing Duo	Ukraine	4	Eliminated
Jelly Boy the Clown	47	Danger	Sideshow Act	Iceland	3	Eliminated
Jonathan Burns	42	Comedy / Magic	Comic Magician	Lancaster, Pennsylvania	4	Eliminated
Journeyy	9	Singing / Music	Singer & Pianist	Jersey City, New Jersey	3	Eliminated
Kelsey Jane	33	Acrobatics	Aerialist	Dallas	3	Semi-finalist
L6	24–38	Singing	Vocal Group	San Pedro, Philippines	4	Eliminated
Learnmore Jonasi	30	Comedy	Comedian	Pittsburgh	3	Grand-finalist
Legión	21–40	Dance	Malambo Group	Buenos Aires, Argentina	2	Eliminated
LiV Warfield	44	Singing	Singer	Peoria, Illinois	1	Eliminated
Los Osos High School	15–18	Dance	Dance Group	Rancho Cucamonga, California	1	Eliminated
Maya Neelakantan	10	Music	Electric Guitarist	Chennai, India	3	Eliminated
Menudo	10–15	Singing	Boyband	San Juan, Puerto Rico	3	Eliminated
NiNi	28	Music	Musician	Taichung, Taiwan	2	Eliminated
Oscar Stembridge	16	Singing / Music	Singer & Guitarist	London	4	Eliminated
Phillip Lewis	27	Variety	Baton Twirler	Statesboro, Georgia	1	Eliminated
Pranysqa Mishra	9	Singing	Singer	Tampa, Florida	4	Semi-finalist
Reid Wilson	14	Singing	Singer	Montgomery, Alabama	3	Semi-finalist
Richard Goodall	55	Singing	Singer	Terre Haute, Indiana	1	Winner
Roni Sagi & Rhythm	30	Animals	Dog Act	Tel Aviv, Israel	1	Runner-up
Sabrina	13–21	Dance	Dance Group	Japan	3	Eliminated
Sam Huang	23	Magic	Magician	Kaohsiung, Taiwan	3	Eliminated
Schumacher	37	Variety	Novelty Act	Japan	2	Eliminated
Sebastián & Sonia	24 & 30	Acrobatics	Aerial Duo	Barcelona, Spain	4	Finalist
Sky Elements	25–55	Variety	Drone Display Group	Dallas	2	Third place
Solange Kardinaly	40	Magic	Quick Change Artist	Leiria, Portugal	4	Grand-finalist
Stephanie Rainey	36	Singing / Music	Singer & Guitarist	Cork, Ireland	4	Eliminated
The Reklaws	30 & 32	Singing	Band	North Dumfries, Ontario	3	Eliminated
Tonikaku	42	Variety	Novelty Act	Setagaya City, Japan	4	Eliminated
Young-Min	33	Magic	Magician	Seoul, South Korea	2	Semi-finalist

=== Quarter-finals summary ===
Buzzed Out | Live Golden Buzzer | Advanced to Finals | Advanced to Semifinals | Eliminated (Top 5)

==== Quarter-final 1 (August 13) ====
Guest Performer, Results Show: Adrian Stoica and Hurricane

Participant	Order	Buzzes				Result (August 14)
Participant	Order	Cowell	Vergara	Klum	Mandel	Result (August 14)
Flewnt and Inkabee	1					Eliminated
Attraction Juniors	2					Eliminated (Top 5)
LiV Warfield	3					Eliminated
Hypers Kids Africa	4					Eliminated (Top 5)
Ashes & Arrows	5					Advanced
Los Osos High School	6					Eliminated
Hakuna Matata Acrobats	7		Live Golden Buzzer			Advanced
Phillip Lewis	8					Eliminated
Roni Sagi & Rhythm	9					Advanced
Arshiya	10					Eliminated
Richard Goodall	11					Advanced

==== Quarter-final 2 (August 20) ====
Guest Performer, Results Show: Mat Franco

Participant	Order	Buzzes				Result (August 21)
Participant	Order	Cowell	Vergara	Klum	Mandel	Result (August 21)
Legión	1					Eliminated
Young-Min	2					Advanced
Alex Sampson	3					Advanced
Bboy Samuka	4					Eliminated (Top 5)
Brooke Bailey	5					Eliminated
Sky Elements	6					Advanced
AIRFOOTWORKS	7	^{1}			Live Golden Buzzer	Advanced
Biko's Manna	8					Eliminated
Schumacher	9	Buzzed Out				Eliminated
Ashlee Montague	10					Eliminated (Top 5)
NiNi	11					Eliminated

- ^1 Although it was Mandel's week to press the golden buzzer, Cowell attempted to press the golden buzzer for this act. At the same time, Mandel promptly attempted to press the golden buzzer as well. During a replay at the end of the show, it was revealed that Mandel pressed the buzzer slightly before Cowell.

==== Quarter-final 3 (August 27) ====
Guest Performers, Results Show: Lauren Daigle & Loren Allred

Participant	Order	Buzzes				Result (August 28)
Participant	Order	Cowell	Vergara	Klum	Mandel	Result (August 28)
Menudo	1					Eliminated
Sam Huang	2					Eliminated
The Reklaws	3					Eliminated
Sabrina	4					Eliminated
Kelsey Jane	5					Advanced
Journeyy	6					Eliminated (Top 5)
Learnmore Jonasi	7					Advanced
Dee Dee Simon	8			Live Golden Buzzer		Advanced
Maya Neelakantan	9					Eliminated (Top 5)
Reid Wilson	10					Advanced
Jelly Boy the Clown	11					Eliminated

==== Quarter-final 4 (September 3) ====
Guest Performer, Results Show: Jon Dorenbos

Participant	Order	Buzzes				Result (September 4)
Participant	Order	Cowell	Vergara	Klum	Mandel	Result (September 4)
Brent Street	1					Advanced
Illya & Anastasia Strakhov	2					Eliminated (Top 5)
Oscar Stembridge	3					Eliminated
Jonathan Burns	4	Buzzed Out				Eliminated
L6	5					Eliminated
Tonikaku	6					Eliminated
Stephanie Rainey	7					Eliminated
Sebastián & Sonia^{2}	8	Live Golden Buzzer				Advanced
Erica Rhodes	9					Eliminated (Top 5)
Solange Kardinaly	10					Advanced
Pranysqa Mishra	11					Advanced

- ^2 Sebastián did a live solo performance as Sonia was sidelined after sustaining an arm injury during rehearsals.

=== Semi-finals summary ===
Advanced to Finals

==== Semi-final (September 11) ====
Guest Performers, Results Show: Sofie Dossi & Sara James

Participant	Order	Buzzes				Result (September 12)
Participant	Order	Cowell	Vergara	Klum	Mandel	Result (September 12)
Pranysqa Mishra	1					Eliminated
Kelsey Jane	2					Eliminated
Alex Sampson	3					Eliminated
Young-Min	4					Eliminated
Ashes & Arrows	5					Eliminated
Roni Sagi & Rhythm	6					Advanced
Reid Wilson	7					Eliminated
Brent Street	8					Advanced
Richard Goodall	9					Advanced
Learnmore Jonasi	10					Advanced
Sky Elements	11					Advanced
Solange Kardinaly	12					Advanced

=== Finals summary ===
Guest Performers, Results Show: Detroit Youth Choir, Michael Bublé and the 2024 Gold Over America Tour gymnasts (Simone Biles, Jordan Chiles, Jade Carey, Ellie Black, Mélanie de Jesus dos Santos, Joscelyn Roberson, Frederick Richard, Paul Juda, Brody Malone, Casimir Schmidt, Ian Gunther)

Winner | Runner-up | 3rd place | Top 5

Finalist	Performed with (2nd Performance)	Result
AIRFOOTWORKS	Steve Aoki	Finalist
Brent Street	N/A^{3}	Finalist
Dee Dee Simon	Detroit Youth Choir and Andra Day^{4}	Finalist
Hakuna Matata Acrobats	N/A^{3}	Finalist
Learnmore Jonasi	Gabriel Iglesias	Grand-finalist
Richard Goodall	Neal Schon and members of Journey	1st
Roni Sagi & Rhythm	N/A^{3}	2nd
Sebastián & Sonia	Detroit Youth Choir and Andra Day^{4}	Finalist
Sky Elements	N/A	3rd
Solange Kardinaly	Las Vegas cast of Magic Mike Live	Grand-finalist

- ^3 Brent Street, Hakuna Matata Acrobats and Roni Sagi & Rhythm conducted a joint routine for their second performance.
- ^4 Dee Dee Simon and Sebastián & Sonia conducted a joint routine for their second performance, and thus shared the same guest performers.

== Ratings ==
Viewership and ratings per episode of America's Got Talent season 19
No.	Title	Air date	Timeslot (ET)	Rating (18–49)	Viewers (millions)	Ref.
1	"Auditions 1"	May 28, 2024	Tuesday 8:00 p.m.	0.5	5.33	
2	"Auditions 2"	June 4, 2024	Tuesday 8:00 p.m.	0.5	5.38	
3	"Auditions 3"	June 11, 2024	Tuesday 8:00 p.m.	0.5	5.53	
4	"Auditions 4"	June 25, 2024	Tuesday 8:00 p.m.	0.5	5.22	
5	"Auditions 5"	July 2, 2024	Tuesday 8:00 p.m.	0.5	5.25	
6	"Auditions 6"	July 9, 2024	Tuesday 8:00 p.m.	0.5	4.82	
7	"Auditions 7"	July 16, 2024	Tuesday 8:00 p.m.	0.4	4.60	
8	"Auditions 8"	July 23, 2024	Tuesday 8:00 p.m.	0.5	5.33	
9	"Quarterfinals 1"	August 13, 2024	Tuesday 8:00 p.m.	0.4	4.99	
10	"Quarterfinals 1 Results"	August 14, 2024	Wednesday 8:00 p.m.	0.3	4.31	
11	"Quarterfinals 2"	August 20, 2024	Tuesday 8:00 p.m.	0.4	4.32	
12	"Quarterfinals 2 Results"	August 21, 2024	Wednesday 8:00 p.m.	0.3	3.35	
13	"Quarterfinals 3"	August 27, 2024	Tuesday 8:00 p.m.	0.4	4.79	
14	"Quarterfinals 3 Results"	August 28, 2024	Wednesday 8:00 p.m.	0.3	3.85	
15	"Quarterfinals 4"	September 3, 2024	Tuesday 8:00 p.m.	0.4	4.80	
16	"Quarterfinals 4 Results"	September 4, 2024	Wednesday 8:00 p.m.	0.3	4.26	
17	"Semifinals"	September 11, 2024	Wednesday 8:00 p.m.	0.4	4.94	
18	"Semifinals Results"	September 12, 2024	Thursday 8:00 p.m.	0.4	4.17	
19	"Finale Performances"	September 17, 2024	Tuesday 8:00 p.m.	0.4	4.83	
20	"Countdown to the Finale"	September 24, 2024	Tuesday 8:00 p.m.	0.4	4.36	
21	"Finale Results"	September 24, 2024	Tuesday 9:00 p.m.	0.4	5.46	
