= Dance Moms season 3 =

Dance Moms
- Season 3
- Dance Moms Season 3 Volume 1 DVD Cover
- Starring: Abby Lee Miller; Gianna Martello; Melissa Gisoni; Maddie Ziegler; Mackenzie Ziegler; Christi Lukasiak; Chloe Lukasiak; Kelly Hyland; Brooke Hyland; Paige Hyland; Holly Hatcher-Frazier; Nia Sioux; Jill Vertes; Kendall Vertes; Kristie Ray; Asia Monet Ray
- No. of episodes: 31 and 8 specials

Release
- Original network: Lifetime
- Original release: January 1 – September 17, 2013

Season chronology
- ← Previous; Season 2 Next → Season 4

The third season of Dance Moms, an American dance reality TV program created by Collins Avenue Productions, began airing on January 1, 2013, on Lifetime television network. The season concluded on September 17, 2013. A total of 39 official episodes and 1 special episode

== Overview ==
The third season continues after the team's win at nationals. Kelly and her daughters Brooke and Paige decide not to return to the Abby Lee Dance Company. The mothers stage a protest to get Kelly to return, leading Abby to completely create a new competition team. The old team, including Kelly, Brooke, and Paige, eventually reunites and becomes Abby's competition team again. This season introduces many new dance moms and dancers to both the Abby Lee Dance Company and Candy Apples Dance Center.

== Cast ==
The third season featured fourteen star billing cast members with various other dancers and moms appearing throughout the season.

=== Dancers ===
- Mackenzie Ziegler
- Chloe Lukasiak
- Nia Sioux
- Kendall Vertes
- Asia Monet Ray (Episodes 14–38)
- Brooke Hyland
- Paige Hyland
- Ally Morgan Serigne (Episodes 1–2)
- Sophia Lucia (episodes 2-3 and 7)
- Maddie Ziegler
- Payton Ackerman

=== Moms ===
- Melissa Gisoni
- Christi Lukasiak
- Kelly Hyland
- Holly Hatcher-Frazier
- Jill Vertes
- Kristie Ray (Episodes 14–38)

=== Guest dancers ===
- Ally Serigne, a lyrical/contemporary dancer from Ponchatoula, Louisiana. She first appeared in "The Beginning of the End", and was later invited to the ALDC to be part of the "replacement" team, which was formed after the elite team protested against Abby. Ally and her mother eventually left the ALDC after Bella's and Kaeli's mothers (Marcia and Gloria, respectively) blamed Ally for ruining the group dance "Cry". She also had a minor cameo in "The Big, Not So, Easy", as she was in the National group dance.
- Bella Hoffheins, a lyrical/contemporary dancer from Leesburg, Virginia. She was invited to the ALDC to be part of the "replacement" team. Along with Kaeli, Bella was kicked out of the ALDC by Abby due to the accusations their mothers made towards Ally. She makes an appearance in "Revenge of the Replacements" when she and Kaeli competed against the ALDC at a competition in Woodbridge, Virginia with their home studio, Studio Bleu Dance Center.
- Kaeli Ware, a lyrical/contemporary dancer from Leesburg. She was invited to the ALDC to be part of the "replacement" team. Along with Bella, Kaeli was kicked out of the ALDC by Abby due to the accusations their mothers made towards Ally. She makes an appearance in "Revenge of the Replacements" later when she and Bella competed against the ALDC with Studio Bleu.
- Sophia Lucia, a jazz/lyrical dancer from San Diego, California. She was invited to the ALDC to be part of the "replacement" team. After the disbandment of the replacement team, Sophia featured on the elite team for a few episodes before finally departing the show in the episode "Rotten to the Core".
- Payton Ackerman

=== Guest Moms ===
- Cathy Nesbitt-Stein (Candy Apples)
- Leslie Ackerman
- Shelly Serigne, mother of Ally. She first appeared in "The Beginning of the End". Shelly later appeared in "Out With the Old, In With the New" with the replacement team. She lastly appeared in "But I'm a National Champion!", by voice only, saying that due to Gloria and Marcia accusing Ally of ruining the group dance, she and her daughter went home to Louisiana. Shelly also had a minor cameo in "The Big, Not So, Easy", as Ally was in the group dance.
- Marcia Hoffheins, mother of Bella. Along with Bella, she was kicked out by Abby in "But I'm a National Champion!" when she and Gloria accused Ally of ruining the group dance "Cry". They later returned as members of Studio Bleu in "Revenge of the Replacements", competing against ALDC.
- Gloria Hampton, mother of Kaeli. She and Kaeli were kicked out by Abby after she and Marcia made accusations towards Ally. They later returned as members of Studio Bleu in "Revenge of the Replacements", competing against ALDC.
- Jackie Lucia, mother of Sophia. She and her daughter were a part of Abby's replacement team in "Out With the Old, In With the New." When the original team was put back into commission in "But I'm a National Champion!", Jackie and Sophia remained on the elite team until departing the show in "Rotten to the Core".

== Cast duration ==
Dancer/Dance Mom	Episodes																																			
Dancer/Dance Mom	1	2	3	4	5	6	7	8	9	10	11	12	13	14	15	16	17	18	19	20	21	22	23	24	25	26	27	28	29	30	31	32	33	34	35	36
Asia																																				
Brooke																																				
Chloe																																				
Kendall																																				
Mackenzie																																				
Maddie																																				
Nia																																				
Paige																																				
Christi																																				
Holly																																				
Jill																																				
Kelly																																				
Kristie																																				
Melissa																																				

=== Notes ===
Key: = featured in this episode
Key: = not featured in this episode
Key: = joins the Abby Lee Dance Company
Key: = left the Abby Lee Dance Company
Key: = returns to the Abby Lee Dance Company

== Episodes ==
No. overall	No. in season	Title	Original release date	US viewers (millions)
44	-	"The Smoke Before the Fire"	January 1, 2013	2.29
The mothers talk about the previous season and what to expect from Season 3. Hosted by executive producer Jeff Collins.
45	1	"The Beginning of the End"	January 1, 2013	2.83
It is the start of the new competition season, and Abby introduces a new dancer, Ally, to the team after discovering Kelly pulled Brooke and Paige out of the ALDC. Chloe is given the featured role in the group routine, but is later replaced by Ally, whose height hindered blocking. Christi feels Abby's actions hurt Chloe despite both girls feeling indifferent. Meanwhile, Cathy and the Candy Apples are in the midst of developing an all-male team. Additionally, Mackenzie has a wardrobe malfunction on stage.
46	2	"Out With the Old, In With the New"	January 8, 2013	2.53
The mothers stage a protest against Abby in the hopes of Kelly's return. Abby quickly assembles a new team by hosting an open-call audition and finds three more girls, Kaeli, Bella, and Sophia, to compete under the ALDC name. At competition, Abby schedules solos for Ally and Sophia, and when a disheartened Bella sees Kaeli preparing a solo -- just in case she is called -- Bella's mother goes behind Abby's back to squeeze one in for her as well. Meanwhile, the original ALDC team performs at a local mall. Note: The moms and girls voluntarily leave the ALDC.
47	3	"But I'm a National Champion!"	January 15, 2013	2.64
The original mothers choose to resign their contracts, including Kelly. They are all put on probation and must redeem themselves. Rounding out the group's newcomer, Sophia, who Abby cites as her new "superstar." Melissa fears that Maddie's top spot is being challenged, and Christi feels punished as Chloe is assigned a solo against Sophia. Meanwhile, Brooke is left out this week's competition as Abby is unsure about her willingness to dance. Additionally, the mothers are hesitant to accept Sophia's mother, Jackie. Note: The moms and girls return to the ALDC.
48	4	"Liar Liar Dance Mom on Fire!"	January 22, 2013	2.51
Melissa begins to feel that Abby's focus on Sophia is taking her attention away from Maddie, and avoids admitting that she is bothered by this. To make matters worse, Maddie is relegated to dancing a duet with Kendall, although Melissa continues to deny her feelings about it. Meanwhile, Sophia is back in California working, and Mackenzie rehearses as her swing in case she does not show up, although Abby still expects her. Additionally, Abby is concerned for Mackenzie's headpiece.
49	5	"Revenge of the Replacements" "Who Won First?"	January 29, 2013	2.56
The ALDC competes against Bella and Kaeli, two of girls who replaced them during the mothers' protest. Melissa tries to get back in favor with Abby, but Abby remains upset with Melissa and Maddie over the previous silent protest. Chloe is challenged with the acrobatic group dance, creating conflict between Abby and Christi. Mackenzie struggles when she is placed atop the pyramid and is assigned a solo, as well as given a spot in the group dance. Meanwhile, Abby later appears teary-eyed after confronting Maddie for not standing up for herself during the protest.
50	6	"Boys Are Cuties, Girls Have Cooties"	February 5, 2013	2.33
The girls rehearse a group dance using hats as props, and Chloe fears she might drop her hat on stage. Unfortunately for her, the hat ends up falling off her head, so Christi chooses to leave the competition before awards in an effort to avoid Abby's wrath. Meanwhile, Cathy hires new choreographer, Anthony Burrell, to join Candy Apples' team, and the rehearse an attractive hip-hop routine. Additionally, Kendall is assigned a solo this week, which Jill cites as an advantage to get into Abby's good graces. Note: Christi and Chloe leave the ALDC.
51	7	"Rotten to the Core"	February 12, 2013	2.59
Chloe is suspended for one week and is not invited to dance at this week's competition. Nia is assigned a duet with Paige, and Holly suggests that the stress of the dance is causing Nia's RND to arise in her foot. Because of this, the dance is pulled even though Nia is still willing to perform. Meanwhile, Candy Apples are scheduled to perform against the ALDC and produce another winning hip-hop routine. Additionally, Sophia briefly comes back only to go home before the competition, and chooses to not return.
52	8	"You've Been Unfriended"	February 19, 2013	2.39
Brooke has been back on the pyramid for a few weeks and is assigned a solo called "Careless" to reflect her supposed lack of interest towards dance; Nia and Paige mussy up the courage to ask Abby if they could perform their duet this week, Abby expects the dance to be perfect. Meanwhile, Christi is upset that Kelly neglected to contact her during Chloe's one-week suspension, even though Kelly says she left multiple voicemails. Additionally, Chloe is upset by Abby during rehearsals. Note: Christi and Chloe return to the ALDC.
53	9	"Bye Bye Baby"	February 26, 2013	2.66
Abby is mourning the loss of her dog, and stays at home as work is a constant reminder of her beloved pet. Gianna is left to finish the group routine in Abby's absence, and the mothers decide to dedicate the dance to Abby's dog with a more upbeat routine. At competition, Abby feels disrespected and scraps the routine, and forces the girls to improvise. Meanwhile, Nicaya is scheduled to perform, and Kaya shares a harsh moment in front of the judges. Additionally, Abby shows distaste in Nia's costume.
54	10	"All's Fair in Love and War"	March 5, 2013	2.19
This week has somewhat of a "love" theme, Abby brings in a male dancer to partner with Brooke in the group routine. The mothers feel this week's theme reflects Abby's demeanor toward the girls, so they take her speed dating. Meanwhile, Nia and Kendall are assigned a duet, and Jill brings in Kendall for a private session to rehearse the dance. At competition, Jill, again, secretly meets with Gianna to rehearse the duet, and Holly confronts Jill about the private sessions.
55	11	"Camouflaged Maneuvers"	March 12, 2013	2.07
The girls struggle while rehearsing a military themed hip-hop group routine and Abby takes the girls to "dance boot camp." Mackenzie has sudden pain in her foot, and Melissa takes her to the doctor. She is later spotted doing cartwheels in the hall, and Abby is suspicious over the validity of her injury. Meanwhile, Abby finds success from her speed dating endeavor and goes on a date with someone she met. Additionally, Jill gets new head shots made of Kendall and shows them off to Abby.
56	12	"The Apple of Her Eye"	March 19, 2013	2.15
Abby is unsure about the development of Mackenzie's foot injury so Mackenzie is benched for this week's competition; Nia is on top of the pyramid and gets assigned a featured role in the group routine, which Holly is excited about. Jill hides how upset she is about Kendall not being featured, despite it being an ethnic role. Meanwhile, Candy Apples is scheduled to perform this week and the boys rehearse a dance similar to Gangnam Style. Additionally, Chloe and Paige are assigned their long awaited duet.
57	13	"She's a Maniac"	March 26, 2013	2.25
Abby hires broadway star Rachelle Rak to guest choreograph the group routine. Abby feels Mackenzie is not strong enough to join the group dance, but is later placed in the routine by Rachelle behind Abby's back. Meanwhile, Maddie and Mackenzie are assigned their first duet together reflecting their relationship with their mother, Melissa, whose personal life Abby cites as a hindrance toward their willingness to dance. Additionally, Chloe is scolded for breaking her routine on stage.
58	14	"Watch Your Back, Mack"	April 2, 2013	2.34
Abby introduces the team to new dancer, Asia, who is the same age as Mackenzie, and her mother, Kristie. Asia is assigned a solo for the Mini Division, which saddens both Melissa and Mackenzie. Meanwhile, Candy Apples hires a new choreographer to help produce this week's group routine, who, unbeknownst to Cathy, is an old friend of Abby's. Despite this, the boys from Candy Apples perform a "perfect" routine. Additionally, Abby consults a taxidermist about stuffing her beloved pet. Note: Kristie and Asia join the ALDC.
59	15	"The Politics of Dancing"	April 9, 2013	2.39
Abby's group routine is inspired by the political state of America, and features Paige holding up the American flag. At competition, Paige's dancing causes her to hold the flag backwards, which infuriates Abby. Carrying-on with the political theme, Maddie and Chloe must perform head-to-head, and Abby has asked the team to vote on whom they think performed the best. Meanwhile, Abby, again, benches Mackenzie this week, Mackenzie has to watch Asia slowly take over her position on the team.
60	16	"May I Have This Dance?"	April 16, 2013	2.26
Abby assigns Maddie as assistant choreographer instead allowing her to dance in the group routine to see if the other girls are capable of winning without her. Distracted, Abby is unable to do a run-through of Nia and Asia's duet. Meanwhile, Abby is invited to guest-host on The View, and brings along the Elite Team to perform. Abby is still unsure about Mackenzie's injury, and rehearses Asia in her spot for "My Last Text", although the mothers agree Mackenzie should still dance as it is her original role.
61	17	"The View from the Top"	April 23, 2013	2.26
Abby stages blocking of "My Last Text" for The View with both Mackenzie and Asia on different instances, and Kristie tells Asia to give Abby a thank you card in hopes of earning the spot on television. When Abby ultimately selects Mackenzie, the mothers confront Melissa about the injury, again, questioning if she were really in pain or if she was simply nervous about dancing against Asia. Meanwhile, Cathy takes Anthony with her to New York to host an open-call audition for the Candy Apples Dance Center.
62	18	"Candy Apple Showdown"	April 30, 2013	1.97
The ALDC is still in New York, and is scheduled to perform at a competition in which the Candy Apples are also in attendance. Taking a break from rehearsals, the mothers take the girls ice skating, although Kristie tells a saddened Asia to sit out for fear of injury. While lacing their skates, the Candy Apples show up. At competition, Abby overhears Cathy and Anthony criticizing Paige's technique, and tells Paige to confront them. Additionally, Abby considers moving the studio across the country.
63	19	"Tell All, Part 1"	May 7, 2013	1.11
The mothers and Abby reunite to talk about what has happened so far in Season 3. Hosted by executive producer Jeff Collins.
64	20	"Tell All, Part 2"	May 14, 2013	1.37
The mothers and Abby continue the talk about Season 3 so far. Hosted by executive producer Jeff Collins.
65	21	"Abby's Mother's Day Special"	May 7, 2013	N/A
In this one-hour special, Abby Lee Miller introduces us to her mother and shares their amazing bond and history. She also gives her thoughts on the Dance Moms’ fabulous and not so fabulous mothering skills.
66	22	"Boy Crazy, Mom Crazy"	June 4, 2013	1.45
Abby feels that Brooke is ready to dance with the Senior Company and invites them to the upcoming competition. Brooke is assigned a featured role partnering in the Senior dance and is set up on a date by Abby in hopes of building on-stage chemistry. Meanwhile, Cathy readies the Candy Apples to compete, and feels that one of her boys is being a "rotten apple" and kicks him out of the studio. Additionally, Paige is given a solo in an effort to prove herself to Cathy and Anthony.
67	23	"Two Girls, One Solo"	June 11, 2013	1.68
Hoping to prove which girl is her number one dancer, Abby choreographs Maddie and Chloe the very same solo – including music – which shocks the mothers. Mackenzie and Asia also perform head-to-head. Meanwhile, the girls are asked to channel the death of a loved one while dancing a routine inspired by cancer victims entitled "Living With the Ribbon." At competition, Chloe was initially announced as first overall winner, but the director of Powerhouse Dance later enters the dressing room stating that her score was miscalculated, meaning that, after all, Maddie still won.
68	24	"An Apple a Day Keeps Abby Away"	June 18, 2013	1.79
Abby is in Los Angeles scouting studios to place the new ALDC and working on Abby's Ultimate Dance Competition. The girls are on a break from competing, and the mothers are assigned, long distance, to "spy" on the Candy Apples at their next competition. The mothers phone Abby to report the new members of the Candy Apples' team, and that former ALDC dancers now compete with them. Meanwhile, Anthony assigns one of the boys a solo, the boy is uncomfortable with his costume.
69	25	"No Room for Rotten Apples"	June 25, 2013	1.82
Anthony brings in drag queen, Malik So-Chic, to teach the Candy Apples how to dance like the club kids from 1990s and help make elaborate, brightly colored costumes. Meanwhile, Abby is still in LA, and the mothers are upset to discover that Melissa sent Maddie to perform on Abby's Ultimate Dance Competition when they made a pact not to send any of the girls if she were invited. Additionally, Cathy assigns a male-female duet, and her female dancer is concerned about her heavy headpiece.
70	26	"Dance Moms Chatter, Part 1"	July 2, 2013	1.01
Christi, Kelly, Black Patsy, and two super fans discuss Season 3 so far. Hosted by executive producer Jeff Collins.
71	27	"Dance Moms Chatter, Part 2"	July 9, 2013	1.04
Abby, Melissa, and two super fans discuss Season 3 so far. Hosted by executive producer Jeff Collins.
72	28	"Tap Versus Hip Hop"	July 16, 2013	1.76
Maddie and Chloe, again, compete head-to-head with Maddie dancing tap and Chloe dancing hip-hop. At competition, Maddie has wardrobe malfunction, and Melissa is upset about Abby's reaction toward Maddie for completing her dance, whereas Chloe gets scolded at previous incidents. Meanwhile, the girls rehearse a group routine inspired by the deaths of famous leading ladies of Hollywood. Additionally, Mackenzie is told by Abby to not participate in recess as she got winded during rehearsals.
73	29	"Abby's So Far This Season"	July 22, 2013	1.62
Abby Lee Miller hosts a clip show featuring exhilarating moments thus far of Season 3.
74	30	"Recital Rebellion"	July 23, 2013	1.62
This week is the annual recital, and Abby is very stressed. The girls rehearse a new group routine and each girl is asked to perform a solo. Kelly is upset when she discovers that the new dance which Paige has been rehearsing, is pulled by Abby and replaced by Maddie's AUDC dance. Meanwhile, Dance Track Magazine invites the ALDC for a photo shoot in their back-to-school issue, and each girl is assigned a different persona. However, only one girl is selected for the cover.
75	31	"Clash of the Dance Moms"	July 30, 2013	1.85
Brooke and Paige do not return after Kelly's blowup. Payton is brought in to replace Brooke who was supposed to have a featured role in this week's group routine, and Leslie is determined to make her position on the team more permanent. Meanwhile, Candy Apples is scheduled to perform at this week's competition, and Anthony rehearses a trio reflecting the ALDC mothers' spying on them. Additionally, Cathy and Anthony invite their mothers to the competition who confront Jill about some rude remarks made.
76	32	"The Dancing Dead"	August 6, 2013	1.74
Nia is placed at the top of the pyramid after asking Abby how she can improve. Abby receives her pet's newly taxidermied remains, and assigns Nia a solo dedicated to the beloved animal. Meanwhile, the mothers miss having Kelly at the studio and visit her at home, convincing her to attend the competition, which embarrasses Abby. Additionally, Kristie is upset when Mackenzie is placed ahead of Asia on the pyramid, and strongly suggests going back home if Asia does not dance a weekly solo.
77	33	"Gone, Abby Gone"	August 13, 2013	1.86
Gianna learns that Abby selects to stay home with her ailing mother, leaving her to manage the team for this week's competition. Kelly uses her absence as an opportunity to bring the girls back to the studio, and Abby refuses to come back to work while Brooke and Paige are still there. Meanwhile, Brooke asks Gianna if she can dance a solo, but only if Abby says yes; Leslie gloats after Abby threatens Gianna with termination if she produces a routine for her.
78	34	"On-Again, Off-Again Abby"	August 20, 2013	1.94
The girls are excited after their clean sweep in Abby's absence and celebrate Gianna's win. The mothers are upset to discover Melissa visited Abby at her home without their knowledge, citing it as another way to get Maddie to the top. Finally, Abby returns after spending time with her sick mother, and is stunned to find Brooke and Paige back at the studio. Meanwhile, Cathy was unhappy with Anthony and relieves him of his duties, but when a mother steps up to the plate, she is infuriated to receive zero credit.
79	35	"Diva Las Vegas"	August 27, 2013	1.84
Abby uses this week to see which girls will perform at Nationals and assigns each girl a solo. Meanwhile, Abby is not impressed by Brooke's and Paige's development since returning to the studio, and brings in guest choreographer, Ricky Palomino, to teach them new solos in an effort to prove themselves. At competition, Paige is fearful of Abby's judgement, and freezes on stage. Kelly breaks down after Paige's performance, causing a teary-eyed Abby to consider rebuilding her relationship with the family.
80	36	"Do-Si-Do and Do-Si-Don't"	September 3, 2013	1.78
There is only one week left, and each girl must prove herself if she wants to dance at Nationals. The girls rehearse a group routine packed with acrobatic tricks, and Mackenzie has a featured role in the dance, but falls out of a move on stage. Despite this, Mackenzie also performs her first solo in weeks and wins first place, and is told to thank Asia for her dance improvement. Meanwhile, Maddie is spotlighted in Dance Spirit Magazine, which riles the mothers. Additionally, Chloe and Asia perform a creepy duet.
81	37	"The Big, Not So, Easy"	September 10, 2013	1.94
The pressure is on to see who gets to dance at Nationals this weekend. After Abby learns of an altercation between Christi and Leslie, Chloe and Payton are removed from competition. Kristie is upset that the mothers continue to bicker, and takes Asia home. Meanwhile, the Candy Apples are in town to compete and Cathy hires Blake McGrath as her new choreographer after a dispute with Anthony. Additionally, the girls rehearse a group routine inspired by Hurricane Katrina victims. Note: Kristie and Asia leave the ALDC and the show entirely.
82	38	"Dance Moms Reunion: Hurricane Abby"	September 17, 2013	1.27
Abby Lee Miller and the mothers recap Season 3. Hosted by executive producer Jeff Collins.
83	39	"Dance Moms Holiday Special: Twas the Fight Before Christmas"	December 10, 2013	1.12
A holiday themed chat with both the ALDC and Candy Apples. Hosted by executive producer Jeff Collins.
