= Dance Moms season 7 =

Dance Moms
- Season 7
- Season 7 promotional poster
- Starring: Abby Lee Miller; Gianna Martello; Christi Lukasiak; Chloe Lukasiak; Holly Hatcher-Frazier; Nia Sioux; Jill Vertes; Kendall Vertes; Kira Girard; Kalani Hilliker; Ashlee Allen; Brynn Rumfallo; Yolanda Walmsley; Elliana Walmsley; Stacey Ketchman; Lilliana Ketchman; Camille Bridges; Camryn Bridges; Jaime Caes; Maesi Caes
- No. of episodes: 29 and 1 special

Release
- Original network: Lifetime
- Original release: November 29, 2016 – October 24, 2017

Season chronology
- ← Previous; Season 6 Next → Season 8

The 7th season of Dance Moms, an American dance reality television created by Collins Avenue Productions, premiered on November 29, 2016 on Lifetime's television network. The season concluded on October 24, 2017. A total of 29 official episodes and 1 special episode aired this season.

== Cast ==
The seventh season features thirteen star billing cast members, with various other dancers and moms appearing throughout the season. Abby Lee Miller left following the first half of the season announcing her exit in a statement on Instagram. Chloe Lukasiak returned to guest star in Season 7B. This is the final season to feature Nia Sioux, Kendall Vertes, Kalani Hilliker, and Brynn Rumfallo as part of the ALDC team.

=== Choreographers ===
- Abby Lee Miller
- Gianna Martello
- Laurieann Gibson
- Aisha Francis
- Cheryl Burke

=== Moms ===
- Holly Frazier
- Jill Vertes
- Kira Girard
- Ashlee Allen
- Camille Bridges
- Christi Lukasiak
- Stacey Ketchman
- Yolanda Walmsley
- Jaime Caes

=== Guests ===
The following pairs list the dancer first and the mom second.

- Daviana and Fernanda Fletcher
- Jane and Nancy Dickson
- Darrion and Vickie Sellman
- Reagan and Julie Martin

=== Candy Apples Dance Center ===
The following pairs list the

- Vivi-Anne Stein and Cathy Nesbitt-Stein
- Ava Michelle and Jeanette Cota
- Nicaya and Kaya Wiley (Black Patsy)
- Haley and Melanie Huelsman
- Chloe and Liza Smith
- Tara and Shari Johnson
- Lennon (Zack) and Gina Torres

== Cast duration ==
Dancer/Dance Mom	Episodes																												
Dancer/Dance Mom	1	2	3	4	5	6	7	8	9	10	11	12	13	14	15	16	17	18	19	20	21	22	23	24	25	26	27	28	29
Brynn																													
Camryn																													
Chloe																													
Elliana																													
Kalani																													
Kendall																													
Liliana																													
Maesi																													
Nia																													
Ashlee																													
Camille																													
Christi																													
Holly																													
Jaime																													
Jill																													
Kira																													
Stacey																													
Yolanda																													

=== Notes ===
Key: = featured in this episode
Key: = not featured in this episode
Key: = joins the Abby Lee Dance Company
Key: = leaves the Abby Lee Dance Company
Key: = returns to the Abby Lee Dance Company
Key: = joins The Irreplaceables
Key: = returns to the show
Key: = leaves the show entirely
Key: = leaves the Abby Lee Dance Company and the show entirely

== Episodes ==
No. overall	No. in season	Title	Original release date	US viewers (millions)
185	1	"Fight for Your Life"	November 29, 2016	1.03
After an explosive competition and eight week break, Abby reaches out to the Junior Elite moms and asks that they come to the ALDC to hear an announcement that she believes will change everything. Abby decides to merge the mini team and the original team together to form one super team, and how the dancers perform onstage will determine where they stand. Kendall and Brynn are assigned solos head to head, with the losing soloist having their position challenged. Note: Brynn, Kalani, Kendall, and Nia along with their mothers Ashlee, Kira, Jill, and Holly return to the ALDC.
186	2	"Abby's Worst Nightmare"	December 6, 2016	1.04
The mini team have been benched due to Abby not knowing what to do with them, and two new dancers (Daviana and Camryn) are brought in to be added to the team. The girls compete against the Candy Apples and come face to face with enemy Black Patsy who mocks both Kendall and new dancer Camryn. Nia and Kalani have a duet which places 3rd and Brynn and Kendall have a duet that places 2nd. The ALDC win 1st place and Candy Apples place 3rd. Note: Camille and Camryn join the ALDC.
187	3	"Return of the Rotten Apples"	December 13, 2016	0.90
It's Kalani's 16th birthday, and is given the gift of a car. The group routine then becomes inspired by reckless driving, of which Kalani is the lead. The Candy Apples are performing a routine which is a tribute to Cathy's daughter Vivi-Anne who has a featured role in the routine. Kendall has a solo inspired by the horror movie The Scream which she's places 1st with. Black Patsy's daughter, Nicaya has a solo inspired by Harriet Tubman which places 3rd. The ALDC win 1st with the group routine and Nicaya is angry as she believes that the ALDC won because they were famous.
188	4	"Winner Takes All"	December 20, 2016	1.04
When Daviana was with her old studio, she beat Kalani at a competition. The two are pitted against each other with contemporary solos, and if Daviana loses she will risk being cut from the team. Meanwhile, Elliana and Lilliana, two members of the mini team return to fight for the lead role in the group routine. Elliana becomes the lead which leaves Lilliana benched and not performing. At the competition the group routine wins, even though mistakes were made by Elliana. Kalani wins with her solo but Daviana places 6th, and as a result is cut from the team.
189	5	"New Kid on the Block"	December 27, 2016	0.87
Daviana is cut, and Abby brings in new dancer Maesi to bridge the age gap between Elliana and Brynn. The group routine is a hip-hop routine which is supposed to be what Maesi excels at, but unfortunately she forgets the dance onstage which leads to the group placing third. Maesi's mother Jaime feels bullied by Yolanda and Stacey (Elliana's and Lilliana's mothers) and the three dancers are assigned a trio that places 3rd. Kalani, Kendall and Brynn are also assigned a tio which places 1st. When Abby blames Maesi for the group losing, she's cut her from the team. However, Yolanda feels unsafe from the original mothers and offers Maesi her daughter's spot on the team. Note: Jamie and Maesi join the ALDC.
190	6	"No Clowning Around"	January 3, 2017	1.09
The whole team are back, including Maesi and Elliana. Maesi is given a solo to redeem herself from last week and Nia and Camryn are also given solos head to head. The group routine is inspired by the Killer Clown attacks, and despite the group being a mess onstage, it still wins. Nia' solo wins 1st overall and Maesi and Camryn's solos do not place. Due to an argument between the original mothers and Camille (Camryn's mother) earlier in the competition, they are disappointed when Abby allows both Maesi and Camryn to stay, despite their solos not placing.
191	7	"The Fresno Curse"	January 10, 2017	1.07
The ALDC are traveling to Fresno, California to perform a mature piece inspired by the film The Help. Nia is given the lead role and both her and Camryn have to portray maids, while Brynn, Kendall and Kalani have to portray socialites. Maesi, Elliana and Lilliana are not old enough to perform such as piece and Abby needs a 3rd maid. She then brings Daviana back because of this and the group wins 1st place. Brynn and Camryn have a winning duet, Kendall and Kalani's duet comes in 2nd place and Elliana and Maesi have a duet that gets pulled due to the behaviour of their mothers. Despite the group winning, Daviana is not allowed back on the team.
192	8	"ALDC Ain't Dead Yet"	January 17, 2017	0.96
In this week's group routine, the girls have to portray gravediggers. When only the older dancers are allowed to perform this dance, Jaime is annoyed as her family work in a graveyard. Elliana and Lilliana have solos against each other, which means Maesi is benched for the week. Elliana' solo is inspired by Charlie Chaplin, and the team is shocked when Yolanda arrives at the competition dressed as him. The group wins 1st overall with Lilliana's acrobatic solo also winning 1st overall, and Elliana placing 5th due to sticky stage limiting her tricks in her routine.
193	9	"Battle of the Blondes"	January 24, 2017	1.00
The mothers suspect that Brynn is only given the lead roles because there is no one who has a similar appearance on the team, meaning she stands out more. So Abby brings in a new dancer named Jane who will be Brynn's opposite. The group dance is all about polygamy, and the dancers performing are the older girls and Maesi. However Maesi is removed from the dance because she doesn't look old enough. Brynn has a solo based on plastic surgery which places 3rd, Maesi has a hip-hop solo she learnt at her old studio which places 2nd, and Lilliana performs another acrobatic solo which wins 1st overall. Despite the group routine winning a perfect score, Jane is cut from the team, much to the disappointment to her, her mother and the rest of the ALDC.
194	10	"Breathless In Denver"	January 31, 2017	1.10
This week all of the dancers will be performing in the group dance, and they will be portraying eskimos. The original mothers don't like their daughters dancing with the mini members, but the group still wins 1st overall. Nia and Kendall are assigned solos head to head. Kendall wins 1st place in the Teen Division, with Nia only one place behind. Kalani also has a solo in the Senior Division, which she wins in both her category and overall.
195	11	"Leaving La La Land"	February 7, 2017	0.88
It is the team's last week in Los Angeles, so the older dancers are assigned a difficult ballet routine inspired by the film The Red Violin. Elliana, Lilliana and Maesi are all assigned solos against each other to see whether they have what it takes to perform a solo at nationals. At the competition, the group wins 1st overall but the solos don't do as well. Elliana and Lilliana are tied on 5th overall, and Maesi does not place. After Abby tells Maesi she can never be better than her competitors, Jaime and Measi decide to leave the team.
196	12	"It's Not Always Sunny in Pittsburgh"	February 14, 2017	0.96
The Whole team returns to the studio in Pittsburgh, Pennsylvania and Jaime and Maesi are also with them. The week starts out rocky when Abby puts Elliana at the top of the pyramid for a solo that won 5th overall. The older dancers are assigned a group called Ghost Town, and Camryn is assigned a solo reflecting her view of the ALDC. The team thinks she has said things behind their backs and wants to leave, but she denies this. Meanwhile at the Candy Apples studio, Nicaya is given a solo which is a tribute to her lesbian mother who is about to get married, and the dancers are portraying Mexican builders building the wall Donald Trump wants built. This upsets Black Patsy and she argues with the other mothers, especially Jeanette. At the competition, the ALDC win with Candy Apples coming in 2nd. Camryn wins 1st place with her solo, and Nicaya places 2nd.
197	13	"Same Old Frenemies, Part 1"	February 21, 2017	1.19
The week begins by Abby assigning Elliana, Lilliana, Kalani and Brynn solos at nationals. This upsets Nia, Kendall and their mothers as they have been on the team for over 5 years. Maesi is dismissed for the week, and the older girls are performing a mature piece about cancer. The mothers remind Abby that they have already performed a dance about cancer, so she switches gears and they start learning a number reflecting how sometimes people go down the wrong path in life. Meanwhile at Candy Apples, the team are learning a number about human trafficking. We also see an appearance of Chloe who tells her mother she is thinking about competing again.
198	14	"Same Old Frenemies, Part 2"	February 21, 2017	1.23
The ALDC, Candy Apples and the Lukasiak's travel to nationals. The dancers all perform very well, and Lilliana wins the 11 & under category with Elliana coming in 2nd place. Kalani wins the 12 & over category with Brynn placing the 3rd. The ALDC group wins 1st place, with the Candy Apples coming in 4th. The two teams argue after the awards ceremony, causing Abby to leave the competition and Jeanette and her daughter Ava to leave the Candy Apples team. After Abby's departure, Chloe and Christi burst into the ALDC dressing room, surprising the girls and the moms. Note: Christi and Chloe return to the show.
199	-	"Abby Tells All"	July 25, 2017	0.93
This two-hour special features Abby’s exclusive sit-down interview with Jedediah Bila, co-host of ABC’s "The View" and television personality. Abby reveals her past and her thoughts about the future as she faces the harsh reality of going to prison. Abby also candidly discusses her past mistakes, what she has learned and what fans can expect from her on her release.
200	15	"Judgement Day Approaches"	August 1, 2017	0.73
The team is back after nationals, and Abby decides to put a lyrical number on stage about issues similar to Ashlee's in court. The moms suspect this is to divert the attention off of her and her personal court issues. Elliana & Lilliana have a duet against Kendall & Brynn. Unfortunately, the two minis end up forgetting their number onstage but somehow still win against the two older girls. The group routine pulls off a first place overall win, and the week ends on a high note.
201	16	"Abby Flies The Coop"	August 8, 2017	0.67
Abby brings in her boyfriend to perform a song about veganism, which the moms find "gimmicky" and "jokey". This song is then used for the group routine where every girl will portray a different animal. Kendall has a solo which she has already performed before, and Kalani and Brynn both have solos with a lack of vision and storyline. This makes the moms turn slightly on Abby, but the group still wins 1st place and the team get a so-called "clean sweep" with the solos, making the moms restore faith in Abby.
202	17	"Out With Abby, In With Chloe - Part 1"	August 15, 2017	0.79
Abby has to leave the team and studio due to court issues, leaving the moms no choice but to bring in new choreographer, Laurieann Gibson. The group routine is a strange, commercial, jazz funk dance that is very different to what the girls are used to. Laurieann's aim is to get the girls to break free from Abby's regular routine, so she gives solos to Nia, Camryn and Maesi that are very different to one another. Meanwhile, Christi takes Chloe to MDP, where Chloe will learn a senior jazz routine against the ALDC. Both teams head to competition, and what will happen when Christi comes face to face with Jill?
203	18	"Out With Abby, In With Chloe - Part 2"	August 22, 2017	0.78
After a huge argument between Christi and Jill, the day starts out negatively. Things get worse when Maesi forgets her solo and Kendall forgets steps in the group dance. To top it all off, none of the solos place in the top 3 and the group dance places 4th, while MDP win 1st place. Christi tries to talk to Jill but Jill claims that she plays the victim and leaves unhappy. The week ends on a really low note, and Laurieann doesn't know whether she will return next week
204	19	"All Choked Up"	August 29, 2017	0.76
Laurieann's new routine is inspired by transgender and queer youth. Camryn is given the lead, and Yolanda is upset that her daughter isn't in the dance. She tries to get Elliana to guilt trip Laurieann into putting her into the dance which angers Stacey. This leads Yolanda to claim that Lilliana's and Maesi bully her daughter, which ends in a huge physical fight between her and Stacey. Brynn and Kalani both have solos but the moms don't pay much attention as everyone is so shaken up by Stacey and Yolanda's fight. The tension is carried through to competition, and the judges are not pleased by the dances onstage. The group routine places 2nd, along with Kalani's solo, and Brynn's solo doesn't place at all. The fight that happened in rehearsals finally lead Laurieann to have a dilemma as whether she should return another week.
205	20	"Stamina, Stamina, Stamina"	September 5, 2017	0.65
Laurieann's new routine is a contemporary routine similar to Abby's because she has realised her commercial routines aren't the judges' taste. Kendall and Brynn have a routine which incorporates gym exercises, and Kalani and Nia have a duet that Nia struggles with from the outset. Nia is pulled from the duet and replaced with Camryn which upsets Holly and Nia. Yolanda is annoyed that Elliana hasn't competed recently and misses Abby, but no one is interested after what took place last week. At competition, the team get a clean sweep with the duets, however the competition is rigged so the group routine loses. Laurieann tries to chase the competition organiser but fails, and the moms suspect Abby organised the fix.
206	21	"Ashlee's Big Decision Part 1"	September 12, 2017	0.77
Laurieann has disappeared, and Abby returns to the studio under duress. The elite moms don't like her attitude and leave the studio with their daughters, despite the producers trying to force them back inside. While the mini end of the team decide to stay, the elite members rent out a studio and try and self-choreograph a routine for themselves. All three members of the remaining ALDC team are given solos, and at the elite studio, Brynn feels uncomfortable as Kalani and Camryn try and force her to do choreography she doesn't want to do. Meanwhile, Chloe is competing with MDP once again and has the lead role in the routine. She is under so much pressure already, but then her younger sister Clara is added to the routine doing acro tricks. Which team of the three teams will come out on top? Note: Brynn, Camryn, Kalani, Kendall, and Nia along with their mothers Ashlee, Camille, Kira, Jill, and Holly leave the ALDC.
207	22	"Ashlee's Big Decision Part 2"	September 19, 2017	0.75
It's competition day, and also Maesi's birthday. However no one seems to celebrate it, and Jaime has somehow become Abby's new slave. The elite girls have not choreographed a routine properly, and decide to sell T-shirts and meet fans instead. Lilliana's solo wins the overall high score, and MDP win the overall group award. Abby finds the competition awkward as she's not allowed around Christi, and tries to escape multiple times. Ashlee and Brynn decide to leave the elite girls and return to Abby, and coincidentally Christi and Chloe leave MDP and decide to form a new team with the elite girls. Note #1: Ashlee and Brynn return to the ALDC. Note #2: Camryn, Chloe, Kalani, Kendall, and Nia along with their mothers Camille, Christi, Kira, Jill, and Holly join The Irreplaceables.
208	23	"There's A New Team in Town Part 1"	October 3, 2017	0.77
The elite girls form a new team called the Irreplaceables and call a choreographer called Aisha to choreograph a burlesque, jazz dance. The moms are on board with the idea but the number is seen as controversial. Kendall and Kalani are both given solos but they are pulled by their mothers. Meanwhile at ALDC, Abby brings in a boy to be the lead of her new group dance which is a sequel to a famous dance the original ALDC team did years ago. Brynn, Elliana and Lilliana all have solos and Yolanda decides to leave Camille a voicemail informing her the elite moms are not welcoming of her and Camryn on the newly-formed team. Finally: Holly, Jill, Kira, Christi and Camille decide to meet Stacey, Yolanda and Jaime at a bar to discuss the voicemail. Apparently, Brynn has said on social media that Camryn has been secretly training at the ALDC, which causes an argument between the ALDC moms and Camille. Christi and Holly mock the fight Yolanda and Stacey had, causing a huge fight between Christi and Yolanda when Yolanda criticises Chloe's talent.
209	24	"There's A New Team in Town Part 2"	October 10, 2017	0.77
At competition, the day starts out rocky when Camille and Ashlee argue over Brynn's social media comments. All of the moms on the Irreplaceables team then criticise Brynn's solo calling her a "baby", and the ALDC moms criticise the Irreplaceables for pulling their solos, calling them "cowardly". The Irreplaceables' moms then criticise Abby for recycling an old dance, and the ALDC moms criticise Aisha's routine, claiming it was inappropriate. Abby walks out, disgusted by Aisha's routine and doesn't return. Yolanda is upset that the one time Elliana beats Lilliana, she is absent and unable to see it. The Irreplaceables' moms then mock Brynn when her solo doesn't place at all, but karma soon when comes around when the ALDC win their division and the Irreplaceables don't win theirs. Ashlee says that the Irreplaceables' moms are "disgusting", which make them criticise Brynn even more, causing her to bite back at them. The ALDC moms are impressed with Brynn and their team, but Aisha is not impressed with hers, deciding that she will not return the next routine.
210	25	"Everyone's Replaceable... Even Abby"	October 17, 2017	0.75
Aisha is absent, so Christi calls Cheryl Burke to be the new choreographer. Nia and Chloe have a duet, and Kendall and Camryn that's a continuation from Nia and Chloe's. The group routine is about protesting against Abby, and the moms and girls are all excited. Meanwhile at the ALDC, Abby's employee Miranda choreographs a group number which is a tribute to Abby and Gianna. The moms are hoping that this tribute will make Abby return and work with the girls again. At competition, the Irreplaceables' moms mock the tribute for its title, but the ALDC moms don't retaliate. Kendall and Camryn's duet wins, and Nia and Chloe's places 3rd. The Irreplaceables' group routine gets 5th overall, and the ALDC's tribute gets 2nd overall. Abby texts Miranda and fires her for choreographing a routine behind her back, and Ashlee and Brynn leave the team due to the Irreplaceables' moms verbally abusing them online. The other ALDC moms decide to disband the team as they believe the end has come. Note #1: Ashlee and Brynn leave the ALDC and the show entirely. Note #2: Elliana, Liliana, and Maesi along with their mothers Yolanda, Stacey, and Jamie leave the ALDC.
211	26	"Under Cheryl's Spell"	October 24, 2017	0.80
Jill and Kendall are absent this week, so Cheryl brings in a girl called Reagan from a rival studio to fill Kendall's spot for the week. Just like Daviana, Reagan beat Kalani at one of the previous competitions, making her mother Julie believe she is the strongest of the team. Kalani and Camryn both have solos, and Christi is angered when Reagan gets the third solo over Chloe or Nia. The moms argue with Julie during rehearsals, which stresses Cheryl out and makes her want to leave. In the group routine the girls will portray witches, and while practicing Kalani sprains her ankle leading to her solo getting pulled and her also losing her place in the group dance. Camille and Camryn then feel threatened and afraid because they have to battle Reagan on their own. At competition, the group wins 1st place for the first time without Abby, Camryn wins 1st overall with the solo, and Reagan places 4th. Cheryl decides she doesn't need Reagan and dismisses her, and the team returns to normal for the next week.
212	27	"The Best Is Yet To Come"	October 24, 2017	0.78
Jill and Kendall are back, and it's finally nationals. The group routine is an open routine that's a mixture of jazz, contemporary and ballroom. Cheryl gives solos to Kalani, Nia and Chloe. Jill is upset that Kendall doesn't have a solo because Kendall has been on the team for years, so she begs and begs until Cheryl gives in and choreographs a solo for Kendall as well. At competition, the girls all compete their solos and then get ready for the group routine. Chloe has a nosebleed but quickly recovers, Kalani is still in pain from her ankle and Jess and Jojo show up to support the team. Nia wins her solo division with Kendall and Chloe finishing second and third respectively, Kalani ties for second in her division and the group wins overall. After the competition, the girls tearfully reminisce about their time together and the friendships they've shared. Note: Camryn, Kalani, Kendall, and Nia along with their mothers Camille, Kira, Jill, and Holly leave the show entirely.
213	28	"Abby's Last Dance"	October 24, 2017	0.51
Abby reflects on the past seven years and the legacy she's leaving behind as she prepares to serve her prison sentence.
214	29	"Chloe & Christi's Encore"	October 24, 2017	0.31
Chloe and Christi talk about how they came to join the ALDC, Chloe's rivalry with Maddie, and what made them decide to return to the competition world. Note: Chloe and Christi leave the show entirely.
