= Dance Moms season 8 =

Dance Moms
- Season 8
- Season 8 promotional poster
- Starring: Abby Lee Miller; Gianna Martello; Stacey Ketchman; Lilliana Ketchman; Tricia Farrar; Brady Farrar; Ann Colin; Hannah Colin; Joanne Paolantonio; GiaNina Paolantonio; Michelle Georgiana; Sarah Georgiana; Ashley Hosbach; Pressley Hosbach; Erin Kristich; Savannah Kristich; Lakisha Samuels; Paris Moore
- No. of episodes: 18 and 3 specials

Release
- Original network: Lifetime
- Original release: June 4 – September 10, 2019

Season chronology
- ← Previous; Season 7

The eighth season of Dance Moms is an American dance reality television series created by Collins Avenue and stars Abby Lee Miller after she completed her prison sentence and was diagnosed with non-Hodgkin's lymphoma in 2018. Miller rebuilds her dance company while battling the after-effects of the cancer that has left her using a wheelchair.

== Cast ==
This season was based at the Abby Lee Dance Company (ALDC) in Pittsburgh, Pennsylvania, and introduces a new cast of dancers and their moms, who appear throughout the season. Lilliana Ketchman, Elliana Walmsley, and their respective mothers (seasons 6 and 7) return this season. JoJo and Jessalynn Siwa (seasons 5 and 6) also return as guest stars.

=== Choreographers ===
- Abby Lee Miller
- Gianna Martello
- Laura Jarczewski

=== Dancers ===
- Elliana Walmsley (episodes 7-11)
- GiaNina Paolantonio
- Hannah Colin
- Lilliana Ketchman
- Sarah Georgiana
- Paris Moore (episodes 13-18)
- Pressley Hosbach
- Brady Farrar (episodes 1-5 and 9-18)
- Savannah Kristich (episodes 1-6)

=== Moms ===
- Yolanda Walmsley (episodes 7-11)
- Joanne Paolantonio
- Ann Collin
- Stacey Ketchman
- Michelle Georgiana
- Lakisha Samuels (episodes 13-17)
- Ashley Hosbach
- Tricia Farrar
- Erin Kristich (episodes 1-6)
- Bridget Creighton (episodes 1-3

=== Guests ===
- Maesi Caes – former elite ALDC dancer; episode special "The New Team"
- Jaime Caes – former ALDC mom; episode special "The New Team"
- Kamryn Smith – guest ALDC dancer; episode 8
- Adriana Smith – guest ALDC mom; episode 8
- JoJo Siwa – former elite ALDC dancer; episode 9
- Jessalynn Siwa – former ALDC mom; episode 9
- Berkleigh Hernandez – guest ALDC dancer; episode 13
- Amanda Hernandez – guest ALDC mom; episode 13

== Cast duration ==
Dancer/Dance Mom	Episodes																	
Dancer/Dance Mom	1	2	3	4	5	6	7	8	9	10	11	12	13	14	15	16	17	18
Brady																		
Elliana																		
GiaNina																		
Hannah																		
Lilliana																		
Paris																		
Pressley																		
Sarah																		
Savannah																		
Ann																		
Ashley																		
Erin																		
Joanne																		
Lakisha																		
Michelle																		
Stacey																		
Tricia																		
Yolanda																		

=== Notes ===
Key: = featured in this episode
Key: = not featured in this episode
Key: leaves the Abby Lee Dance Company and the show entirely
Key: = returns to the Abby Lee Dance Company
Key: = leaves the Abby Lee Dance Company
Key: = joins the Abby Lee Dance Company

== Episodes ==
No. overall	No. in season	Title	Original release date	US viewers (millions)
215	-	"The New Team"	June 4, 2019	N/A
Casting special: A look at the new dancers featured in the new season.
216	-	"The Return of Abby"	June 4, 2019	N/A
Special: Abby endures physical and emotional struggles while undergoing chemotherapy and learning to regain the use of her legs, all the while pushing forward to keep her dream of a new competitive dance team for the Abby Lee Dance Company alive.
217	1	"Abby's Big Comeback"	June 4, 2019	N/A
Abby finally returns to the competition dance scene in Pittsburgh where her legacy first began. Emotions run high and tension builds as Abby hopes her new team of seven strangers can dance together as one.
218	2	"Mommy Dearest"	June 4, 2019	N/A
Abby gives Lilly and Savannah the first solos of the season, leading Erin to explode at the competition. The team struggles with a challenging tribal dance called a haka, which originates from New Zealand. Meanwhile, Lilly cracks under the pressure.
219	3	"The Broadway Brat"	June 11, 2019	N/A
Abby challenges the team with her most serious group dance yet, and casts Lilly as the lead for the first time in her ALDC career. When GiaNina complains about her choreography, Abby unleashes her wrath on the Broadway veteran.
220	4	"Choose Wisely"	June 18, 2019	N/A
Abby makes a shocking announcement that she's sending someone home. Stacey and Tricia go to war over Abby's star dancer, Brady. When tasked with picking their own duet partners, the young dancers fear that the wrong decision could send them home.
221	5	"Queen of the ALDC"	June 25, 2019	N/A
Abby sends Brady home, changing the future of the ALDC team. A tribute to Queen pushes Brady to his limits, and GiaNina dances for her life in a solo rematch with Hannah. Note: Tricia and Brady leave the ALDC.
222	6	"Lilly's Ultimatum"	July 2, 2019	N/A
With Brady gone, Abby challenges the girls to prove that they can win on their own, and Lilly is given an unprecedented ultimatum. GiaNina is assigned a Snooki solo, causing Joanne to complain about the dance's content and costume. Deciding she'd had enough with the Snooki solo fiasco, Abby pulls the number right before competition. Meanwhile, Sarah is assigned a Mary Lou Retton solo, who hopes her first solo can be a personal win for her family. Note: Erin and Savannah officially leave the ALDC and the series.
223	7	"Yolanda's Back"	July 9, 2019	N/A
It's hell week at the ALDC and Abby assigns the girls a group dance about sorority hazing. As a plan to motivate the girls, Abby brings back former teammates, Yolanda and Elliana. Seemingly causing more harm than good, Erin and Savannah shockingly quit the team with the return of these two familiar faces. Note: Yolanda and Elliana come back to the ALDC.
224	8	"A Team On Trial"	July 16, 2019	N/A
With a losing streak weighing heavily upon the team's shoulders, fighting between the girls puts the group dance in jeopardy. Abby brings in Kamryn and her mother Adriana to join the team. In the end, Abby sees that Kamryn isn't a good fit for the team since she's too young, leading to Abby dismissing her. A duet with GiaNina and Elliana leads to an all-out war between Yolanda and Stacey.
225	9	"Making a Splash in Pittsburgh"	July 23, 2019	N/A
Heading to her first competition in Pittsburgh since her return, Abby challenges the ALDC team with their most daring routine yet. Longtime rivals Lilly and Elliana go head-to-head in famous solos inspired by former ALDC member JoJo Siwa. Meanwhile, Abby brings Tricia and Brady back on the team. Note: Tricia and Brady come back to the ALDC.
226	10	"No More Mamma Drama"	July 30, 2019	0.53
With only 6 weeks until nationals, the team has the worst record in ALDC history, and Abby is blaming the mothers. Abby has Brady and Lilly go head-to-head to show her who deserves a solo at nationals. Fed up with Michelle's focus on Studio 19, a local rival and Sarah's former dance company, Abby kicks Sarah out of the group dance. When Studio 19 shows up at the competition, Abby calls the police on Michelle, who she thinks is to blame.
227	11	"Hannah Unmasked"	August 6, 2019	0.60
Hannah faces her biggest challenge yet when Abby assigns her the lead in the group dance, while Elliana and Sarah have a solo showdown. Abby's treatment of Michelle threatens to tear Sarah and Michelle apart, and Yolanda threatens to quit the team if Elliana doesn't come out on top. Note: Yolanda and Elliana officially leave the ALDC and the series.
228	12	"2 Jackets, 4 Dancers"	August 13, 2019	0.62
As news spreads of Elliana's shocking departure, Abby challenges the team with a ballet group inspired by The Angry Birds Movie 2, casting GiaNina as the lead. Rivalries brew as two duets (GiaNina/Pressley and Brady/Lilly) compete against their partners for ALDC jackets, and Michelle is berated after the ongoing Studio 19 drama.
229	13	"Abby's Audition"	August 20, 2019	0.62
With nationals approaching quickly, the moms lash out when Abby decides to hold an open call audition for a new team member. Pressley and Hannah compete for their shot to perform at nationals, and Abby receives devastating news from Los Angeles. Note: Lakisha and Paris join the ALDC.
230	14	"The Return of Studio 19"	August 20, 2019	0.58
GiaNina and Sarah go head-to-head for their shot at dancing a solo at nationals while the team performs a group routine unlike anything done before. Michelle comes to blows with the other moms, and a confrontation at competition sends Abby over the edge.
231	15	"Rise From the Ashes"	August 27, 2019	0.69
With only one week until nationals, the pressure is on for the ALDC. Abby choreographs her most personal group dance yet, while Brady and Pressley go head-to-head for the chance of dancing solos at nationals. Tired of being bullied by Abby and the other moms, Michelle and Sarah abruptly leave the team.
232	16	"New York Nationals"	August 27, 2019	0.65
The ALDC team heads to nationals in New York City, with Brady, Lilly, and Pressley going head-to-head for the national title. Tensions reach a boiling point when Abby is confronted by Studio 19.
233	17	"Reunion: Return of the ALDC"	September 3, 2019	0.38
After a season jam-packed with mama drama, Jai Rodriguez sits down with the entire cast of "Dance Moms" to right the wrongs and finally set the record straight. The new elite team performs some of its award-winning dances from the season.
234	-	"Unseen Dances, Untold Stories"	September 3, 2019	0.28
Watch some never before seen dances and see the explosive drama unfold from Season 8. Learn new things about your favorite dancers and moms in this Dance Moms special.
235	18	"Reunion: Kids Tell All"	September 10, 2019	0.21
Jai Rodriguez joins the newest members of the ALDC as they dish the dirt on Abby, the moms, secret crushes and more. The girls and Brady give performances of their favorite award-winning dances.

== Production ==
The eighth season was announced in December 2018, when it was confirmed that Abby Lee Miller would return to the show. This season was originally titled Dance Moms: Resurrection, and set to premiere on June 4, 2019.

Season eight is produced by Jeff Collins ("The Drama Queen"); Bryan Stinson ("So Sharp"); Lindsay Weiglein; Tessa Khalaieff; Michael Hammond ("Hell's Kitchen"); and Gena McCarthy, Brie Miranda Bryant and Kimberly Chessler (Lifetime).
