= Dance Moms: Miami =

American reality television series

- Genre: Reality
- Starring: Victor Smalley; Angel Armas
- Country of origin: United States
- Original language: English
- No. of seasons: 1
- No. of episodes: 8

Production
- Executive producers: Bryan Stinson; Gena McCarthy; Jeff Collins; John R. Corella; Kim Chessler; Rob Sharenow; Sara Quick
- Running time: 42 minutes
- Production company: Collins Avenue Productions

Original release
- Network: Lifetime
- Release: April 3 – May 29, 2012

Related
- Dance Moms

Dance Moms: Miami is an American reality television series on Lifetime that aired from April 3, 2012, to May 29, 2012. It is a spin-off of Dance Moms.

== Premise ==
The series follows Victor Smalley and Angel Armas, the co-owners of Stars Dance Studio in Miami, Florida. Smalley and Armas have been co-owners of the studio since it opened in 2007, and often juggle handling Victor's mother and Stars Dance Studio manager Mayra Smalley's demands and that of the competitive dance moms at the studio. The show follows the studio as they travel around to different local Florida dance competitions.

== Cast ==
- Victor Smalley, co-owner of Stars Dance Studio
- Angel Armas, co-owner of Stars Dance Studio
- Mayra Smalley: Victor's mother, makeup artist and manager for Stars Dance Studio

=== The Moms ===
- Brigette Triana: Lucas' mother. Brigette is a realtor in the Miami area and the mother of 3 boys, Lucas, Logan and Lex. Brigette danced from age three throughout high school, and two of her sons are enrolled at Stars Dance Studio. She strongly believes Stars Dance Studio's competition team is a generation of future dancers, and states becoming a Dance Mom at SDS was hard as the other moms think she's a little crass. She gets divorced in the end of Season 1. She is now with Candy Apples Dance Center.
- Abby Small: Sammy's mother. Abby is a stay-at-home mom whose life revolves around dance and family. Although the studio is located in Miami, Abby and Sammy come to Stars from Fort Lauderdale each day. Even though Abby's husband hates paying for dance costs, Abby states dance is a tradition in the family as Sammy's sister Hayley is also a dancer. Abby believes jealousy stems from others because she and Sammy are pretty and rich.
- Debi Epstein: Hannah's mother. Debi is a creative mom of four who owns a business besides supporting Hannah's dreams to become a great dancer. Debi considers herself a typical New Yorker and two of her daughters are enrolled at Stars Dance Studio.
- Anicia Gutierrez: Kimberly's mother. Nicknamed Ani, she considers herself the peacemaker out of the moms on the competition team, and is a devoted working mom who works to support Kimmy unconditionally when it comes to her finding art through dance.
- Susan Kennedy: Jessica's mother. Susan's mother danced for the National Ballet Company of Colombia and was always too busy to monitor Susan's dancing. Therefore, Susan makes it a priority for her only daughter, Jessi, to find limelight and passion through the art of dance, even if it means coming off as overbearing and controlling.
- Leonora Diaz: Mia's mother. Nicknamed Leo, Brigette does not like her, yet Lucas loves Mia. She says the other mothers bully her but that she will always stand her ground and defend Mia.

=== Dancers ===
- Sammy Small: Sammy was 12 years old during the filming of the series. She is a highly trained technical dancer who excels in the genres of jazz, contemporary and acrobatics. Before being cast on Dance Moms: Miami, Sammy danced for Dance Academy of Fort Lauderdale, now known as DANL Dance Center. Sammy's siblings include a sister named Hayley and two brothers named Andrew and Scott. As of late 2016, Sammy still dances with Stars and is a member of its senior company.
- Hannah Epstein: Hannah was 11 years old during the filming of the series. Hannah is originally from Bayville, New Jersey. Like Sammy, she previously danced at Dance Academy of Fort Lauderdale before coming to Stars Dance Studio two years ago. Hannah has a brother named Hunter and two sisters, Kayla and Carina. Hannah is not considered the best dancer at Stars and is often shunned by Jessi's mom. Upon entering high school, Hannah quit dancing at Stars and, as of late 2016, is an active member of her high school's dance team.
- Kimberly "Kimmy" Kopke: Kimmy was nine years old during the series. Her favorite style of dance is contemporary. During the series Kimmy was known for being the most well-behaved student and was even hesitant to do a single "bad" act when Angel and Victor dared her to misbehave to get into character for a sassy jazz dance. As of late 2016 she is still dancing with Stars and is a member of its teen company. She has also launched her own line of dance, cheer and fitness accessories.
- Jessica "Jessi" Kennedy: Jessi was 14 years old during filming. She danced at Stars Dance Studio from its opening in 2007 until about 2014 when she left to dance with her school team, however she has continued to take class from and assist Victor and Angel at various conventions and classes. Prior to joining Stars, she danced at Encore Cheer and Dance Company in Miami. Her grandma used to be a professional dancer, and she gives Jessi a lot of dancing advice. It's possible that she will not be returning to Stars for the next season. Jessi's mom Susan revealed that, as a child, Jessi was obese and had self-confidence issues. She graduated high school sometime in 2016 but appears to still be dancing with the Coral Reef High Varsity Cudettes.
- Lucas Triana: Lucas was nine years old during filming. He has two younger brothers named Logan and Lex. Lucas began dancing when he was three, but quit when he was five to play soccer. He returned to dance at the age of seven and, when he was eight, changed studios and began attending Stars Dance Studio. Lucas won Junior Mr. NexStar 2012. He was the only male dancer on the show at this time. In his spare time, Lucas enjoys playing Xbox with his father Oscar. Lucas has also done modeling and has been in commercials. In the season finale, it is revealed that his parents are getting divorced because of the amount of time his mother spends at the dance studio and competitions. Lucas is widely known for his technique. Triana later appears on Dance Moms competing with the Candy Apples. He has since quit dancing.
- Mia Diaz: Mia appeared in the last episode of Season 1. She was 10 years old at the time of dancing. She was enrolled in Just Dance It before coming to Stars Dance Studio. She started dancing at 2 1/2 years of age. Her talent agency is Bloc Agency. Her favorite styles of dance are musical theater, jazz, lyrical, and contemporary. If she decides not to continue dancing, she'll take up singing. Mia has two brothers, Ryan and Tyler. Her mother originally didn't want Mia to be on the show due to the drama, but Mia begged so much that her mom eventually complied. She has a step sister Brittnee, who also dances at Stars Dance Studio. As of 2016, Mia does not dance full-time anymore but occasionally takes classes at Stars.

== Episodes ==
No.	Title	Original release date	U.S. viewers (millions)
1	"Get Fierce!"	April 3, 2012	1.55
2	"Moms Making Waves"	April 10, 2012	TBA
3	"Don't Judge Me!"	April 17, 2012	0.95
4	"Your Duet Can Take a Bow"	May 1, 2012	0.86
5	"Don't Take That Tone With Me!"	May 8, 2012	TBA
6	"Pushed to the Edge of the Dance Floor"	May 15, 2012	0.92
7	"No One Likes a Quitter"	May 22, 2012	0.76
8	"Move Over, I'm the Star"	May 29, 2012	0.82

== "The List" ==
Much like "The Pyramid" in the original Dance Moms, "the List" is used to show the moms and the dancers who both Angel and Victor feel did the best and who needs to improve. The list changes every week. While Abby Lee Miller graded her dancers based on the titles they had previously won at competitions and the moms' attitudes, Angel Armas states the grading system at Stars Dance Studio is strictly based on the dancers' overall attitudes and performances regardless of awards and placing. Like with Dance Moms, the grading system was suggested to the dance instructors by the show producers in order to create more drama on the show. Lucas Triana is the dancer who has been 1st on the list the most often.

Episode	1	2	3	4	5	6	7	8
1st	Jessi	Lucas	Lucas	Kimmy	Jessi	Lucas	Jessi	Lucas
2nd	Sammy	Kimmy	Kimmy	Sammy	Kimmy	Kimmy	Kimmy	Hannah
3rd	Kimmy	Sammy	Sammy	Jessi	Lucas	Jessi	Lucas	Sammy
4th	Lucas	Hannah	Jessi	Lucas	Hannah	Sammy	Hannah	Kimmy
5th	Hannah	Jessi	Hannah	Hannah	Sammy	Hannah	Sammy	Jessi
