= New Girl in Town (disambiguation) =

New Girl in Town may refer to

== Film, TV and theatre ==
- New Girl in Town (1957 musical), a Tony-winning musical based on the play Anna Christie
- Friends: New Girl in Town (2012 film), film in the Lego film franchise, see List of Lego films
- Nashville Girl (1976 film), film also released as "The New Girl in Town (film)"
- "The New Girl in Town", Episode 14 of Teenage Mutant Ninja Turtles. It marks the first appearance of Karai, the adopted teenage daughter of Oroku Saki/the Shredder.
- New Girl In Town (2012 TV episode), season 2 episode of "Dance Moms", see List of Dance Moms episodes
- New Girl in Town (The Inside episode) (2005 TV episode), season 1 episode 1 of "The Inside" crime drama TV series
- New Girls in Town (2005 TV episode), season 1 episode of "The Girls Next Door", see List of The Girls Next Door episodes
- The New Girl In Town (2002 TV episode), season 2 episode of "As Told by Ginger", see List of As Told by Ginger episodes
- New Girl in Town (1998 TV episode), season 4 episode of "Hang Time", see List of Hang Time episodes
- "There's a New Girl in Town" (2009 episode), season 2 episode of "The Real Housewives of New York City", see List of The Real Housewives of New York City episodes

== Music ==
=== Albums ===
- The New Girl in Town (1985 album), unreleased album by "Selena y Los Dinos"

=== Songs ===
- "New Girl In Town", song by Buddy Bregman and His Orchestra Theme, Merrill 1957
- "A New Girl In Town", song by Louise Mandrell R. C. Bannon, John Bettis 1984
- "There's a New Girl in Town", theme song for Alice (TV series), performed by Linda Lavin

== See also ==
- The Berenstain Bears and the New Girl in Town, a children's picture book in the Berenstain Bears franchise
- New Girl (disambiguation)
