= Brave New Girl =

Brave New Girl may refer to:

- Brave New Girl (novel), a novel by Louisa Luna
- "Brave New Girl", a song by Britney Spears from In the Zone
- Brave New Girl, a 2004 TV movie adapted from the novel A Mother's Gift by Britney and Lynne Spears
- Brave New Girls, a Canadian television reality series which premiered in 2014

== See also ==
- New Girl (disambiguation)
