= New Girl (disambiguation) =

New Girl is an American sitcom.

New Girl or The New Girl may also refer to:

== Television ==
- "New Girl" (The Office), a 2001 episode
- "The New Girl" (Haven), a 2013 episode
- "The New Girl" (Mad Men), a 2008 episode
- "The New Girl" (Saved by the Bell), a 1992 episode

== Music ==
- "New Girl", a song from The Suicide Machines' 1995 album, Destruction by Definition
- "New Girl", a New Boyz song from their 2009 album Skinny Jeanz and a Mic
- "New Girl", a 3OH!3 song from their 2013 album Omens
- "New Girl" (song), a Reggie 'N' Bollie song
- "New Girl", a 2014 song from As One

== Books ==
- The New Girl (Stine novel), a 1989 novel by R. L. Stine
- The New Girl (Silva novel), a novel by Daniel Silva

== See also ==
- "New Girl Now", a 1984 song by the Canadian rock band Honeymoon Suite
- New Girl, Old Story, a 1991 album by Tony Lombardo and All
- "New Age Girl", a 1994 song by Deadeye Dick
- New Girl in Town (disambiguation)
- Brave New Girl (disambiguation)
