= Lilliana Ketchman =

American dancer, model and YouTuber

- Ketchman in 2024
- Born: Lilliana Belle Ketchman; June 23, 2008 (age 18)
- Other name: Lilly K
- Occupations: Model; dancer; YouTuber
- Years active: 2010–present
- Known for: Dance Moms

Instagram information
- Page: Lilliana Ketchman
- Years active: 2013–present
- Followers: 3.1 million

TikTok information
- Page: Lillyk
- Followers: 1.6 million

YouTube information
- Channel: Lilliana Ketchman
- Years active: 2015–present
- Subscribers: 4.11 million
- Views: 704 million
- Last updated: November 22, 2025

Lilliana Belle Ketchman (born June 23, 2008), known professionally as Lilly K, is an American dancer, model and social media personality. She is known for her appearances on Lifetime's Dance Moms beginning in season six, and for her YouTube videos.

== Early life ==
Lilliana Ketchman was born June 23, 2008 to Stacey and Christopher Ketchman and has an older brother, Caden. Her mother is a psychologist and dancer while her father is a piano player and psychologist. Her family is from Fayetteville, North Carolina, where she attended Campaneria Ballet School. Ketchman began dancing when she was two years old and started competing at age four.

== Career ==
=== YouTube ===
In 2015, Ketchman launched her YouTube channel, which features videos of her competitions, dance routines, cooking, fashion & beauty tips, games, and her many pranks. Her channel has more than three million subscribers and 288 million views.Dance Moms' Abby Lee Miller became aware of Ketchman via her social media presence and made some videos with her.

=== Dance Moms ===
When she was participating in a photo shoot in New York in 2015, someone suggested she should be on Dance Moms with Abby Lee Miller; Ketchman's mother, however, put off the idea of auditioning due to Miller's reputation. After Miller began following Ketchman on social media, Ketchman was asked to send videos of her dancing. She joined season six of Dance Moms as part of the Abby Lee Dance Company (ALDC) mini team at the age of seven. Ketchman's first solo was "Step by Step", which placed first. In 2017, she joined the ALDC Elite team. Ketchman placed first in the junior division at the national competition. During season seven, Ketchman placed first in a Spokane, Washington, competition with the ALDC.

The only team member to return for season eight, Ketchman won the overall competition for week 14 with her solo "Black Widow". For her solo "Straight Escape" aired during week 16, she performed the entire routine in a straitjacket, earning a perfect score of 300 and finishing first. During the national competition, Ketchman placed second in the junior division and fourth overall with her solo "Inside Out".

=== Music ===
Ketchman has appeared in numerous music videos for artists including Bianca Ryan, Sia, and fellow Dance Moms alumnus JoJo Siwa. In Sia's music video of "Move Your Body", Ketchman's portrayal of a young Sia received critical acclaim. Slate said her moves were what made the music video "so much fun to watch". In November 2020, Ketchman and her mother teased her own single and music video, "Underneath".
