= Dance Moms =

American reality television series

- Genre: Reality
- Created by: Bryan Stinson and John Corella
- Starring: Abby Lee Miller; Gianna Martello; Melissa Gisoni; Maddie Ziegler; Mackenzie Ziegler; Christi Lukasiak; Chloe Lukasiak; Kelly Hyland; Brooke Hyland; Paige Hyland; Holly Hatcher-Frazier; Nia Sioux; Jill Vertes; Kendall Vertes; Kristie Ray; Asia Monet Ray; Kira Girard; Kalani Hilliker; Jessalynn Siwa; JoJo Siwa; Ashlee Allen; Brynn Rumfallo; Yolanda Walmsley; Elliana Walmsley; Stacey Ketchman; Lilliana Ketchman; Camille Bridges; Camryn Bridges; Jaime Caes; Maesi Caes; Tricia Farrar; Brady Farrar; Ann Colin; Hannah Colin; Joanne Paolantonio; GiaNina Paolantonio; Michelle Georgiana; Sarah Georgiana; Ashley Hosbach; Pressley Hosbach; Erin Kristich; Savannah Kristich; Lakisha Samuels; Paris Moore
- Theme music composer: We3Kings
- Opening theme: "Living on the Dance Floor" performed by Nikko Lowe
- Country of origin: United States
- Original language: English
- No. of seasons: 8
- No. of episodes: 224 (with 10 specials) (list of episodes)

Production
- Executive producers: Jeff Collins; Bryan Stinson; Sandi Johnson; John R Corella; Kimberly Chessler; Robert Caplain; Sara Quick; Scott Shatsky; Lindsay Weiglein; Tessa Khalaieff
- Running time: 42 minutes
- Production companies: Collins Avenue Entertainment; Lifetime

Original release
- Network: Lifetime
- Release: July 13, 2011 – September 10, 2019

Related
- Dance Moms: Miami; Abby's Ultimate Dance Competition; Raising Asia; Dance Mums with Jennifer Ellison

Dance Moms is an American reality television series that premiered on Lifetime on July 13, 2011. Created by Collins Avenue Productions, the show followed the training and careers of children in dance and show business under the tutelage of Abby Lee Miller, as well as the relationships between Miller, the dancers, and their mothers. Some of the notable dancers on Miller's team included Maddie and Mackenzie Ziegler, Chloe Lukasiak, Brooke and Paige Hyland, Nia Sioux. The show was originally set in Pittsburgh, Pennsylvania, and later in Los Angeles, California, and primarily filmed at the Abby Lee Dance Company studios.

== Synopsis ==
Primarily set in Pittsburgh, Pennsylvania, and later in Los Angeles, California, Dance Moms originally followed the Abby Lee Dance Company's Junior Elite Competition Team of dancers ages six to thirteen as they traveled week after week to various dance competitions, winning awards and preparing for nationals, while at the same time being prepared by Abby Lee Miller to be "professional, employable working dancers." The series depicted the doting mothers as rivals of each other on behalf of their daughters, often arguing with Miller and each other, and sometimes closing ranks against rival teams. New dance performances—which ranged from solos, duets, trios, and group dances—were creatively conceptualized by Miller and her dance instructors every week, with input from the show's producers, while the choreography was done by Miller, her staff, and occasionally a guest choreographer. Various rival dance teams, such as Candy Apple Dance Center, Broadway Dance Academy, and Studio 19, spurred the team's competitiveness. The show's success was often credited to the drama and conflict between Miller and the moms, along with the weekly dances and the close relationships among the girls, as viewers watched them dance and improve their skills.

The show features Miller as an extremely strict dance team coach who, over the series, relied more and more on criticism—sometimes personal—to motivate the girls, with an emphasis on hard work and competition against teammates. Every week on the show, Miller used a pyramid of individual headshots to rank and gave feedback to each girl, which was decided by the previous week's performance, attitude, effort, the behavior of the girl, and the behavior of her mother. Miller had never used a pyramid in her studio before Dance Moms, and when once asked about it, Miller stated, "I've never done that in my life. That has nothing to do with me. That's the show; they came up with that whole process."

In season 5, Miller relocated the team to Los Angeles to help build her reputation on the West Coast, while the team continued to participate in weekly competitions. The focus shifted to include preparation for careers in the acting and music businesses.

During the second half of season 7, several dancers and their mothers left the ALDC to form "The Irreplaceables." Miller left the show several episodes later, followed by the remaining ALDC dancers and mothers.

In July 2018, Miller announced her return for season 8 of Dance Moms. Executive producer Bryan Stinson announced the show would be casting a whole new team, with final callbacks being in September 2018. On January 12, a new team was selected, consisting of eight dancers. A promo for the new season was released in February, revealing that the show would be set around Miller's diagnosis of Burkitt's Lymphoma while returning "back to her roots" with a new team. The season is set in Pittsburgh, in the same studio where the show began in 2011. Season 8 premiered on Lifetime on June 4, 2019. Although Miller and executive producer Bryan Stinson had both announced plans for a ninth season of Dance Moms, the series did not move forward after controversy involving Miller led to her separation from Lifetime.

== Cast ==
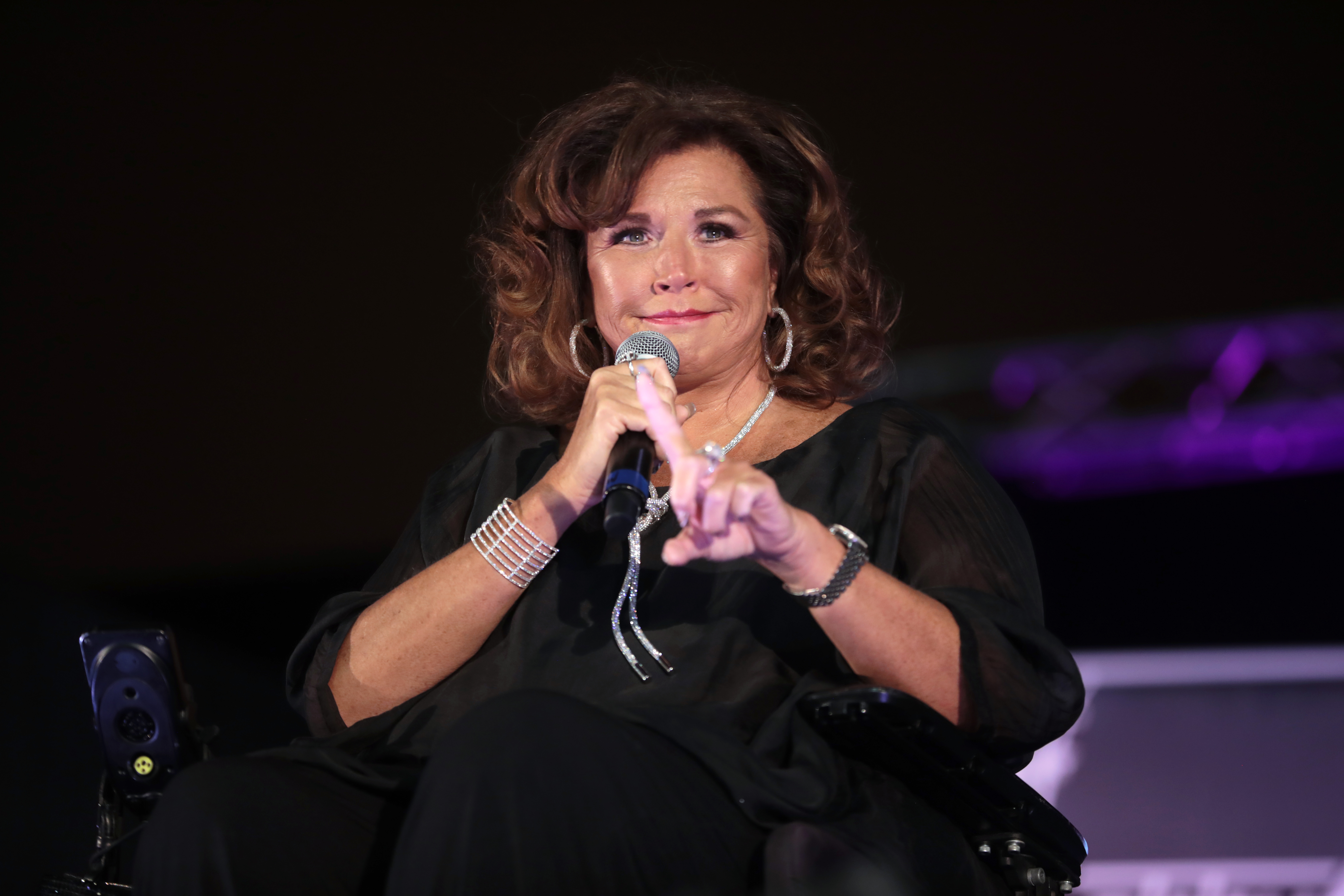
Abby Lee Miller pictured in 2022

=== Abby Lee Dance Company ===
- Abby Lee Miller is the director of Reign Dance Productions (formerly Maryen Lorrain Dance Studio), which houses the Abby Lee Dance Company, of which she is owner and chief choreographer. During season 7B, Miller left the show because of her pending sentence for committing fraud. As a result, the cast fractured into separate dance teams with separate coaches. She returned for season 8.
- Gianna Martello is an instructor for RDP covering all genres of dance, and is also the assistant choreographer for the ALDC Junior Elite Competition team. Martello studied dance under Miller's tutelage through Reign Dance Productions.

==== Seasons 1–7 cast ====
- Melissa Ziegler-Gisoni is the mother of Maddie Ziegler, age 8 at the start of season one, a lyrical/contemporary and tap dancer, and Mackenzie Ziegler, age 6 at the start of season one, an acro/hip hop dancer and singer (formerly under the stage name Mack Z) from Murrysville, Pennsylvania. Maddie was known to be Abby's favorite student during her time on the show, which caused tension between the other moms and Abby. Maddie and Mackenzie studied dance at Abby Lee Miller's studio through Reign Dance Productions from the early ages of four and two, respectively. They were original cast members of the show and left during season six.
- Christi Lukasiak is the mother of Chloe Lukasiak, age 9 at the start of season one, a lyrical/contemporary and ballet dancer from Mars, Pennsylvania. Chloe began dancing at the Abby Lee Miller Dance Company at age two. They were original cast members of the show but left the show following the season four finale. They returned to guest star for the season 7A finale and season 7B before leaving the show once again following the season seven finale.
- Dr. Holly Hatcher-Frazier is the mother of Nia Frazier, age 9 at the start of season one, a contemporary dancer and singer (under the stage name Nia Sioux), from Pittsburgh. Appearing in seven of the eight original seasons, the Fraziers were the show's longest-running cast members. They were original cast members of the show and left the ALDC during season 7 to form "The Irreplaceables". They officially departed the show following the finale.
- Kelly Hyland is the mother of Brooke Hyland, age 13 at the start of season one, and the oldest dancer of the original group, an acro/contemporary dancer and singer, and Paige Hyland, age 10 at the start of season one, an acro/jazz dancer and model from Murrysville. Kelly had been a dancer at ALDC when she was young, and was even taught by Abby herself before quitting to become a cheerleader. Brooke and Paige began dancing at Miller's studio at age 3. The Hylands were original cast members, but left the show in the middle of season four following a physical altercation between Kelly and Abby, and even some altercations with imprisonment and jail time.
- Cathy Nesbitt-Stein is the mother of Vivi-Anne Stein, age 6 at the start of season one, a musical theatre & tap dancer from Canton, Ohio who joined the ALDC for most of season 1. Vivi-Anne was previously a student and team member at her mother's studio, Candy Apples Dance Center, where she continued her dance training after leaving the team and show. Cathy and Vivi-Anne continued to appear as recurring rivals since season two. (Also see "Rival studios" below.) Cathy is considered by Abby to be her ultimate rival. They were original cast members of the show and left following season 7a nationals.
- Jill Vertes is the mother of Kendall Vertes, a jazz/lyrical dancer, model, and singer (under the stage name Kendall K) from Cranberry Township, Pennsylvania. Before joining the ALDC in season 2, Kendall studied dance at Rogers Dance in Pittsburgh and Studio 19. During season two, they switched to Candy Apples Dance Center for several episodes, but ultimately returned to the ALDC. They left the ALDC during season seven to form "The Irreplaceables", departing the show as a whole following the season.

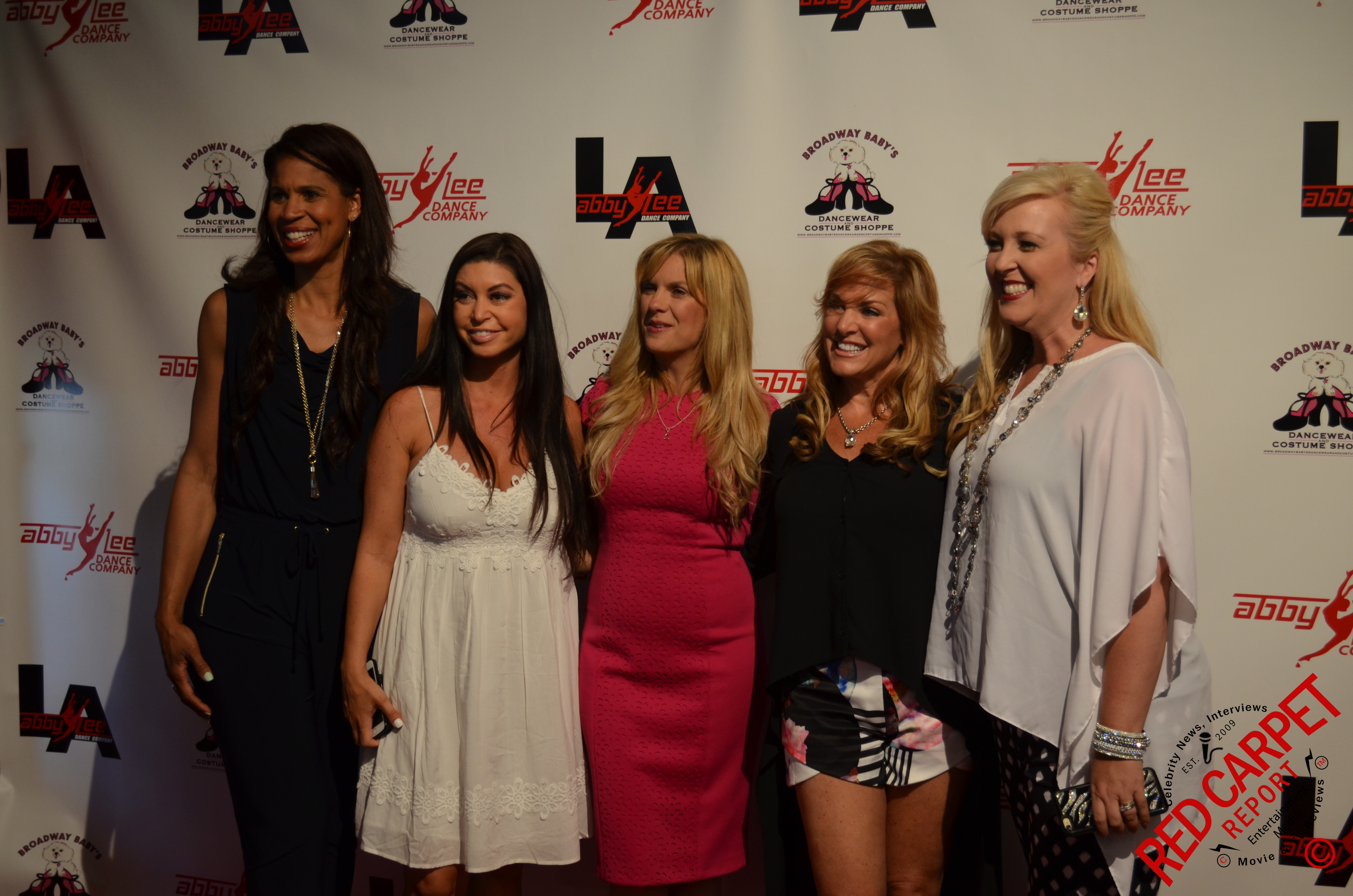
Dance Moms at the May 2015 opening of ALDC-LA in Santa Monica, California, season 5. From left: Holly Hatcher-Frazier, Kira Girard, Melissa Ziegler-Gisoni, Jill Vertes, and Jessalynn Siwa.

- Leslie Ackerman is the mother of Payton Ackerman, a hip hop & contemporary dancer from Upper St. Clair Township, Pennsylvania. Payton began dancing with the ALDC when she was 11 years old. She joined the team as a recurring member multiple times throughout seasons 2-4. She graduated from the ALDC in 2015.
- Kristie Ray is the mother of Asia Monet Ray, a jazz/contemporary dancer and singer (under the stage name Asia Monet) from Corona, California. Asia first appeared on AUDC, where she was the youngest competitor from either season. Asia briefly danced with the Junior Elite Competition Team in season 3 and left just before Nationals.
- Kira Girard is the mother of Kalani Hilliker, a contemporary & lyrical dancer and model/fashion designer from Mesa, Arizona. Kalani appeared on season 2 of Abby's Ultimate Dance Competition (AUDC) and was brought to ALDC in season four to replace Brooke and Paige. After several weeks with the ALDC team in season four, she was made a permanent team member of the ALDC in season five to replace Chloe. They left the ALDC during season seven to form "The Irreplaceables", and left the show following the season finale.
- Jessalynn Siwa is the mother of JoJo Siwa, a jazz/contemporary/hip hop dancer and singer from Omaha, Nebraska. Before joining the ALDC as guests in season five, Jessalynn and JoJo appeared on season two of AUDC. JoJo was brought in to replace Chloe on the ALDC team. After several episodes as a guest dancer, JoJo was made a full-time team member but left the show near the end of season 6 after signing a contract with Nickelodeon. Jessalynn and JoJo also made a guest appearance in season eight.
- Ashlee Allen is the mother of Brynn Rumfallo, a lyrical & contemporary dancer from Phoenix, Arizona. Before Dance Moms, Brynn had trained at Club Dance Studio in Arizona, like her teammate Kalani. Brynn joined the team in season 5 as a guest and was then allowed to be a full-time member of the team for season six. They left the show at the end of season seven, along with the other remaining ALDC members.
- Yolanda Walmsley is the mother of Elliana Walmsley, a lyrical/contemporary and ballroom dancer from Boulder, Colorado. They joined the ALDC mini team in season six, and Elliana joined the elite team in season seven. They left the show during season 7, along with the other remaining ALDC members, but returned for some episodes in season eight. They were later dismissed by Abby after Yolanda caused tension between the other cast members.
- Stacey Ketchman is the mother of Lilliana Ketchman, an acro/ballet and contemporary dancer from Fayetteville, North Carolina. They joined the ALDC mini team in season six, and Lilliana joined the elite team in season seven. They left the show during season seven, along with the other remaining ALDC members, but returned for season eight.
- Camille Bridges is the mother of Camryn Bridges, a jazz & contemporary dancer from St. Louis, Missouri. They joined the ALDC in season 7, but later that season left with several of the other cast members to form "The Irreplaceables".
- Fernanda Fletcher is the mother of Daviana Fletcher, a lyrical/contemporary dancer from Orange County, California. They joined the ALDC alongside Camille and Camryn Bridges in Season 7, but were dismissed from the team after 3 episodes because Miller believed Daviana was not a strong enough dancer. Daviana was brought back for one episode later on in Season 7. It was later revealed that Fernanda and Daviana were dismissed from the show by Lifetime because they didn't cause enough drama, as Miller confirmed in her podcast, "Leave It on the Dance Floor".
- Jaime Caes is the mother of Maesi Caes, a hip hop & contemporary dancer from Altoona, Iowa who danced with Justin Bieber in Des Moines on his Purpose World Tour. They joined the ALDC in season seven, but later that season left along with the other remaining ALDC members. Jaime and Maesi can be seen in the season eight special "The New Team", but didn't return with the team.

==== Season 8 cast ====
- Tricia Farrar is the mother of Brady Farrar, a ballet & contemporary dancer from Miami, Florida. They joined the ALDC in season 8, but later that season, left after Abby's favoritism towards Brady caused tension between the mothers. They later returned to the ALDC. Brady is the first boy ever on the ALDC Junior Elite Competition Team.
- Ann Colin is the mother of Hannah Colin, a lyrical & contemporary dancer from New Albany, Indiana. They joined the ALDC in season 8.
- Joanne Paolantonio is the mother of GiaNina Paolantonio, a lyrical & musical theatre dancer from Oakhurst, New Jersey who played Amanda Thripp in the Broadway musical Matilda and a guest pointe ballerina in The Greatest Showman. They joined the ALDC in season 8.
- Michelle Georgiana is the mother of Sarah Georgiana, an acro & contemporary dancer from Canonsburg, Pennsylvania. They joined the ALDC in season 8, but later that season left after their loyalty to the ALDC was questioned, as well as due to severe bullying they experienced from the other mothers.
- Ashley Hosbach is the mother of Pressley Hosbach, a contemporary & musical theatre dancer from Florham Park, New Jersey. They joined the ALDC in season 8.
- Erin Kristich is the mother of Savannah Kristich, a contemporary/lyrical dancer from Las Vegas, Nevada. They joined the ALDC in season 8, but later that season, left after it was announced that Elliana Walmsey (Savannah's rival) was returning to the show.
- Lakisha Samuels is the mother of Paris Moore, a contemporary dancer from Jacksonville, North Carolina. They joined the ALDC in season 8 to replace Elliana. Paris is the only official team member ever to be featured on the show, not to have a solo, duet, or trio.
- Adriana Smith is the mother of Kamryn Smith, a jazz dancer from Phoenix, Arizona. They were brought on as guests in 1 episode of Season 8 to fill Elliana's spot in a group dance. Kamryn also had a solo that week. They did not come back because Kamryn was too young compared to the rest of the team.
- Amanda Hernandez is the mother of Berkleigh Hernandez, a dancer from Bowie, Maryland. Berkleigh was brought on as a guest to compete in a group dance for one episode alongside Paris, where one of them would earn a spot on the team. The spot ended up going to Paris, so Amanda and Berkleigh did not return for the rest of the show.

Moms	Dancers	Appearances								
Moms	Dancers	1	2	3	4	5	6	7	8	The Reunion
Melissa Ziegler-Gisoni	Maddie and Mackenzie Ziegler	Main (Note: The Zieglers left the show in the middle of season 6, making their final appearance in episode 18)								
Christi Lukasiak	Chloe Lukasiak	Main						Main (Note: The Lukasiaks made a guest appearance in episodes 13 and 14)		Main
Holly Hatcher-Frazier	Nia Sioux	Main								
Kelly Hyland	Brooke and Paige Hyland	Main (Note: The Hylands left the show in the middle of season 4 after a physical altercation with Abby and Kelly in episode 7 (Kelly made a guest appearance in episode 9))								Main
Cathy Nesbitt-Stein	Vivi-Anne Stein	Main	Recurring					Recurring		
Jill Vertes	Kendall Vertes		Main							Main
Kristie Ray	Asia Monet Ray			Main						
Kira Girard	Kalani Hilliker				Recurring	Main				Main
Jessalynn Siwa	JoJo Siwa					Main (Note: The Siwas left the show in the middle of season 6, making their final appearance in episode 25)		Guest		Main
Ashlee Allen	Brynn Rumfallo					Recurring	Main (Note: The Rumfallos left the show in the middle of season 7, making their final appearance in episode 25)			
Yolanda Walmsley	Elliana Walmsley						Recurring	Main	Recurring	
Stacey Ketchman	Lilliana Ketchman						Recurring	Main		
Camille Bridges	Camryn Bridges							Main		
Jaime Caes	Maesi Caes							Main	Guest	
Tricia Farrar	Brady Farrar								Main	
Ann Colin	Hannah Colin								Main	
Joanne Paolantonio	GiaNina Paolantonio								Main	
Michelle Georgiana	Sarah Georgiana								Main	
Ashley Hosbach	Pressley Hosbach								Main	
Erin Kristich	Savannah Kristich								Main	
Lakisha Samuels	Paris Moore								Main	
Recurring cast
Leslie Ackerman	Payton Ackerman		Recurring							
Kaya Wiley	Nicaya Wiley		Guest	Recurring	Guest			Recurring		
Jeanette Cota	Ava Cota				Recurring		Guest	Recurring		
Christy Hunt	Sarah Hunt				Recurring	Guest				

==== "The Irreplaceables" ====
Coaches

- Aisha Francis was the original dance coach for "The Irreplaceables" before Cheryl Burke stepped in.
- Cheryl Burke is the main dance coach for "The Irreplaceables".

Moms and dancers

- Holly Hatcher-Frazier and her daughter Nia Frazier (aka Nia Sioux) (See "Abby Lee Dance Company" above.)
- Christi Lukasiak and her daughter Chloe Lukasiak (See "Abby Lee Dance Company" above.)
- Jill Vertes and her daughter Kendall Vertes (See "Abby Lee Dance Company" above.)
- Kira Girard and her daughter Kalani Hilliker (See "Abby Lee Dance Company" above.)
- Camille Bridges and her daughter Camryn Bridges (See "Abby Lee Dance Company" above.)
- Julie Martin and her daughter, Reagan Martin, made a guest appearance on The Irreplaceables team for one episode.

Select Ensemble

In the second half of Season 4, Abby created a Select Ensemble team, featuring dancers that she selected from 3 separate auditions. The purpose of the team was to have one dancer go up against each original team member, as well as a competing group dance. The Select Ensemble team disbanded in the Season 4 finale after the original team beat them at nationals.

- Jodi Gray and her daughter Kamryn Beck, a lyrical/contemporary dancer originally from Ephrata, Pennsylvania, were brought to the ALDC to compete against Chloe.
- Jeanette Cota and her daughter Ava Cota, a lyrical/contemporary dancer originally from Fenton, Michigan, were brought to the ALDC to compete against Kendall. Ava was cut from the team before nationals following an argument between Abby and Jeanette.
- Tracey Reasons and her daughter, Sarah Reasons, a lyrical/acro dancer originally from Phoenix, Arizona, were brought to the ALDC to compete against Nia. Sarah was brought back as a guest dancer in Season 5 for one episode.
- Loree Cloud and her daughter Jade Cloud, a contemporary/acro dancer originally from Westfield, Massachusetts, were brought to the ALDC to compete against Kalani.
- Tami Adamson and her daughter Tea' Adamson, a musical theater/jazz dancer originally from Miami, Florida, were brought to the ALDC to compete against Mackenzie.
- Christy Hunt and her daughter, Sarah Hunt, a lyrical/contemporary dancer, were also invited onto the Select Ensemble team, although they were already members of the ALDC. Sarah either competed against Mackenzie in the Junior division or competed by herself in the Mini division. Sarah was kicked off the team several times following arguments between Abby and Christy. Sarah made 2 more guest appearances in Seasons 5 and 6.
- Kate Cavanaugh and her daughter Kaleigh Cavanaugh were brought in to compete with the ALDC Elite Team for one episode, with Abby claiming that Kaleigh was "next in line" to be on the Select Ensemble team.
- Maddie Ziegler was also placed on the Select Ensemble team for one episode, as well as Chloe Lukasiak later on.

"The Replacements"

In Season 3 Episode 2, the original team members and their mothers did not show up to filming in an attempt to get Kelly Hyland and her daughters to come back to the team. Abby brought in four new dancers to create a small group, but this group disbanded in the next episode when the original team returned.

- Shelly Serigne and her daughter Ally Serigne, a lyrical dancer from New Orleans, Louisiana. Ally was invited to join the team in Season 3, Episode 1, to audition to become a new team member, but she and her mom left for unknown reasons.
- Gloria Hampton and her daughter Kaeli Ware, a contemporary/lyrical dancer from Alexandria, Virginia. Abby dismissed Kaeli and Gloria from the team after Gloria tried to enter a solo for Kaeli against Abby's wishes. The original team later competed against Gloria's dance studio, Studio Bleu.
- Marcia Hoffeins and her daughter Bella Hoffeins, a contemporary/lyrical dancer from Woodbridge, Virginia. Abby dismissed Bella and Marcia from the team following an argument between Marcia and Gloria. Bella was also a member of Studio Bleu alongside Kaeli.
- Jaclyn Lucia and her daughter Sophia Lucia, a jazz/lyrical dancer from San Diego, California. Sophia remained on the team for a few episodes following the Replacement team's dismissal, but eventually left later on. Sophia holds the Guinness World Record for most consecutive pirouettes.

Mini Team

In Season 6, Abby created a Mini team, consisting of all new dancers between the ages of 6 and 10, hoping that a brand new set of young dancers would continue the Abby Lee Dance Company's legacy. The team was disbanded in the Season 7 premiere, with the exceptions of Elliana Walmsley and Lilliana Ketchman, who were brought back to dance alongside the Elite team.

- Sari Lopez and her daughter, Areana Lopez, a lyrical/jazz dancer from Apple Valley, California. They stayed on the Mini team until its disbandment.
- Tiffanie Oladi and her daughter Alexus Oladi, a contemporary/jazz dancer from Salt Lake City, Utah. They stayed on the Mini team until its disbandment.
- Kerri Evans and her daughter Peyton Evans, an acro/jazz dancer also from Salt Lake City, Utah. They stayed on the Mini team until the Season 7 premiere, when Kerri decided to leave the show.
- Mary Owen and her daughter, Alysa Owen, a jazz dancer from Las Vegas, Nevada. They were on the team for 2 episodes and left for unknown reasons.
- Lynn Fay and her daughter Kendyl Fay, a dancer from Anaheim, California. They appeared for 2 episodes and left because Lynn decided the show wasn't a good environment for her daughter.
- Jeannie Quinn and her three daughters, Kaylee Quinn, Rihanna Quinn, and Coco Quinn, who are all dancers from Los Angeles. They were brought on to compete in a group dance, but left halfway through the week because Jeannie and her daughters disagreed with Miller's teaching methods.
- Yolanda Walmsley and her daughter, Elliana Walmsley, who would later be on the Elite team (see "Seasons 1-7 Cast" above).
- Stacey Ketchman and her daughter, Lilliana Ketchman, who would later be on the Elite team (see "Seasons 1-7 Cast" above).

=== Rival studios ===
- Candy Apples Dance Center (Canton, Ohio) is owned and operated by Cathy Nesbitt-Stein, the mother of Vivi-Anne, who danced with the ALDC in season 1. The CADC has been the main rival of the ALDC throughout seasons 1–5 along with season 7. Over the five seasons of Dance Moms, show producers added several dancers who were well known in the dance competition world and/or had auditioned for Dance Moms in the past, making the "Candy Apples" a team that existed only for television (the real-life Candy Apple team ceased to be featured on the show). Partway through season 5, the CADC was completely recast for one week (see below).
- Studio Bleu Dance Center (Ashburn, Virginia) is coached by Gloria Hampton, the mother of Kaeli, who danced with the ALDC as a guest team member briefly in season 3. Studio Bleu's competition team, which the ALDC competed against several times, was portrayed as a respected and formidable opponent in several episodes.
- Murrieta Dance Project (Murrieta, California) is owned and operated by Erin Babbs, who has been an occasional guest choreographer for the CADC in seasons 4 and 5. MDP competed against the ALDC several times in season 5. In season 7, Chloe Lukasiak joined MDP and danced with the team for a short period of time before leaving MDP to join "The Irreplaceables".
- Broadway Dance Academy (Fenton, Michigan) is owned and operated by Jeanette Cota, the mother of Ava, who guest starred as part of the ALDC "Select Team" in season 4. The real BDA team competed against the ALDC several times in season 5 before leaving the show (except for Ava) to be replaced on the TV team by the four dancers from the former CADC team.
  - Beginning with the start of season 5.5, BDA competed as "Candy Apples" for one week, after which they resumed using their actual name. This team (consisting of Haley Huelsman, Tessa Wilkinson, Chloe Smith, Ashtin Roth, and Ava) won the Overall Group competition, handing the ALDC their first Nationals loss in the group overall category.
- Studio 19 Dance Complex (Pittsburgh, Pennsylvania) is owned and operated by Tammy Croftcheck & Katie Watts. Studio 19 has been the main rival of the ALDC for Season 8.

== Episodes ==
Season	Episodes	Originally released	
Season	Episodes	First released	Last released
1	13	July 13, 2011	October 12, 2011
2	28 (Note: Season 2 also included two special episodes (first, second) that were not allocated episode numbers by Lifetime.)	January 10, 2012	September 25, 2012
3	39 (Note: Season 3 also included one special episode that was not allocated an episode number by Lifetime.)	January 1, 2013	September 17, 2013
4	32 (Note: Season 4 also included two special episodes (first, second) that were not allocated episode numbers by Lifetime.)	January 1, 2014	October 14, 2014
5	32 (Note: Season 5 also included two special episodes (first, second) that were not allocated episode numbers by Lifetime.)	January 6, 2015	August 18, 2015
6	33 (Note: Season 6 also included one special episode that was not allocated an episode number by Lifetime.)	January 5, 2016	November 22, 2016
7	29 (Note: Season 7 also included one special episode that was not allocated an episode number by Lifetime.)	November 29, 2016	October 24, 2017
8	18 (Note: Season 8 also included three special episodes (first, second, third) that were not allocated episode numbers by Lifetime.)	June 4, 2019	September 10, 2019

== Awards and nominations ==
Year	Award	Category	Recipients and nominees	Outcome	Ref.
2012	2012 Teen Choice Awards	Choice TV: Reality Show	Dance Moms	Nominated	
2013	2013 Teen Choice Awards	Choice TV: Reality Show	Dance Moms	Nominated	
2014	2014 Teen Choice Awards	Choice TV: Reality Show	Dance Moms	Nominated	
2014	2014 Teen Choice Awards	Choice TV: Reality Personality (Female)	Abby Lee Miller	Nominated	
2015	2015 Kids' Choice Awards	Nickelodeon: Favorite Reality Show	Dance Moms	Won	
2015	2015 Teen Choice Awards	Choice TV: Reality Show	Dance Moms	Nominated	
2016	2016 Kids' Choice Awards	Favorite Talent Competition	Dance Moms	Nominated	
2017	2017 Teen Choice Awards	Choice Reality TV Show	Dance Moms	Nominated	

== Controversy and criticism ==
Several episodes featured controversial costume choices made by Miller. Due to heavy criticism, the season 2 episode "Topless Showgirls", which aired on March 6, 2012, has been removed from rotation due to complaints from audiences and some of the parents. The episode features the young dancers performing a burlesque-style routine and wearing sequined, flesh-toned bra tops and tights in an effort to make them appear nude. Miller defends her costume choice, saying, "Everyone in the industry knows the girls are completely covered and everything's harmless." Lifetime confirmed pulling the episode. The episode is not included on the season's DVD and is not available on any streaming services.

Kelly Hyland was arrested in early January 2014 on charges of assaulting Miller during a dispute backstage at a dance competition held in New York City during filming for the show's fourth season in November 2013. Hyland appeared in court with Miller on January 21, 2014, and pleaded "not guilty". Former Dance Moms Star Christi Lukasiak later revealed that Miller had accused Hyland's fifteen-year-old daughter, Brooke Hyland, of being on drugs. On a January 29 appearance on The View, Miller announced that Hyland and her daughters Brooke and Paige Hyland were no longer contracted with and would no longer appear on Dance Moms.

On October 13, 2015, Abby Lee Miller was indicted in Pittsburgh on charges of concealing her income from her performances on the show in 2012 and 2013. She was charged with bankruptcy fraud, concealment of bankruptcy assets, and false bankruptcy declarations in hiding some $755,000. In June 2016, Miller pled guilty to the charges, and entered a plea deal with the IRS. In May 2017, Miller was sentenced to one year and a day in prison (paroled after 8.5 months), followed by two years of supervised release.

On June 2, 2020, Miller posted a black square to Instagram on Blackout Tuesday. This caused Adriana Smith, the mother of Dance Moms season 8 dancer Kamryn, to share on Instagram that she and her daughter left the show because of their experience with Miller. "A statement from her that sticks in my mind to this day during my time on DMS8 is 'I know you grew up in the HOOD with only a box of 8 crayons, but I grew up in the Country Club with a box of 64—don't be stupid,'" Smith wrote on Instagram. The following day, on June 3, 2020, another Dance Moms mother, Camille Bridges, accused Miller of treating her daughter Camryn differently because of her race and that the environment was "extremely hostile". She told E! News via e-mail that Miller "tried to spin Camryn as being the poor one and there on scholarship. She would say the most terrible things on camera. It was a traumatic experience that I wish on no one." Miller has since deleted her Black Lives Matter post and on June 4, 2020, she issued an apology to "Kamryn, Adriana, and anyone else I've hurt." It was announced that on June 5, 2020, Lifetime decided to sever ties with Miller as a result of the allegations of the racist remarks she made. The network canceled the Abby's Virtual Dance-Off competition reality series announced in April.

== Spin-offs, tours, and podcasts ==
The first Dance Moms spin-off series, Dance Moms: Miami, set in Miami, Florida, at Victor Smalley and Angel Armas' Stars Dance Studio, premiered on April 3, 2012, but was cancelled in September 2012 after one season.

A sister program titled Abby's Ultimate Dance Competition followed Miller and other dance professionals judging twelve young dancers aged 6–13 years on different styles of dance, hoping to find the most versatile dancer of the group. The series premiered on October 9, 2012, and ran for two seasons. Ray, Siwa, and Hilliker made their debuts on the show before joining the ALDC Elite Team on Dance Moms. On June 24, 2014, another sister program premiered, titled Abby's Studio Rescue. The series followed Miller as she assisted various dance studios across the United States, improving them in areas such as choreography, layout and staffing. A single season of the show was produced.

In July 2014, another spin-off titled Raising Asia starred Asia Monet Ray, a guest team member for several episodes of the third season of Dance Moms. The show followed Ray, her model mom, bodybuilder dad, and younger sister Bella Blu, helping Asia to pursue her dreams of fame in show business.

A British version of Dance Moms titled Dance Mums with Jennifer Ellison premiered on October 20, 2014, and ran for two seasons. Jennifer Ellison hosted the series, set at her Liverpool dance school, Jelli Studios. In 2016, it was reported that Ellen DeGeneres was developing a film based on Dance Moms, though nothing ever came to fruition. In 2018, the Irreplaceables (excluding the Bridges and Fraziers) embarked on the Irreplaceables Tour. The tour included masterclasses, dances, meet & greets, and fan Q&As.

In April 2020, it was announced that another spin-off, Abby's Virtual Dance-Off, would be set to debut in mid-2020. The 12-episode show would consist of taped submissions from dance contestants, with Miller judging via video conference, in keeping with social distancing practiced during the coronavirus pandemic. However, Lifetime pulled the show on June 5, 2020, and cut all ties with Miller after former cast members Camille Bridges and Adriana Smith accused Miller of using racist and condescending language towards their daughters during previous seasons of Dance Moms.

In June 2022, Kelly Hyland and Christi Lukasiak announced their podcast Back to the Barre, which would recap an episode of Dance Moms each week. The podcast has since toured various venues across the United States. It was announced in April 2023 that Miller would be hosting a podcast titled Leave It On The Dance Floor. Each week, she and various guests would discuss information from behind the scenes of Dance Moms. In September 2023, Miller announced that she would be participating in a new reality competition series, in the vein of Big Brother, on the Brandon TV streaming app. Titled Mad House, it featured young adult dancers. Hannah Colin from season 8 of Dance Moms appeared on the first season, while original cast member Cathy Nesbitt-Stein appeared on the second season.

In 2024, Dance Moms: A New Era premiered on Hulu. The series is set at Studio Bleu, who appeared as rivals of the ALDC Elite Team in various episodes of Dance Moms. The series follows dance instructor Miss Glo and a new group of dancers and their mothers. In mid 2024 Studio Bleu permanently closed due to severe financial debt, unpaid rent, and an eviction notice.Following after the closure, coach Gloria Hampton and former staff members opened Project X Dance Company inside the former Studio Bleu.

== Reunion special and season nine ==
On November 1, 2023, Lifetime announced a reunion special titled Dance Moms: The Reunion, which premiered on May 1, 2024. The reunion features Brooke and Paige Hyland, Chloe Lukasiak, Kendall Vertes, Kalani Hilliker, and JoJo Siwa, as well as their respective mothers, Kelly Hyland, Christi Lukasiak (who makes a short, virtual cameo appearance), Jill Vertes, Kira Girard, and Jessalyn Siwa.

Controversially, original cast members Maddie and Mackenzie Ziegler and Nia Frazier did not participate in the reunion, nor did their mothers, Melissa Gisoni and Holly Frazier. This was discussed on the reunion episode and criticised by some cast members. Notably, Jojo Siwa stated, "Them not being here is kinda like, 'let me erase my past, pretend it never happened, shove it down the drain,' when it's like, that's why you are who you are." Nia Frazier stated publicly on her TikTok account why she didn't choose to appear in the episode. "The reason is quite simple. I just didn't want to do it. Some people think it was because I had sorority stuff. Nope, I didn't. Some people think it's because I'm in school. I am in school, but it wouldn't have been an issue. I just didn't want to do it. That's a good enough answer, and that's a good enough reason."

Miller and executive producer Brian Stinson have teased a season nine of Dance Moms. Miller has stated that Kendall Vertes, Kalani Hilliker, and JoJo Siwa could appear on the upcoming season. It has since been stated that Miller's rendition of season nine and the official season nine are two separate shows.

On April 17, 2024, Christi Lukasiak announced via Instagram post that following the premiere of the reunion special, she is hosting her own show, titled Dance Moms: Epic Showdowns.

== See also ==
- Dance Nation, a 2018 Pulitzer-nominated play by Clare Barron which is heavily inspired by the cast of Dance Moms
