= Elliana Walmsley =

American dancer (born 2007)

- Born: Elliana Kathryn Walmsley; June 23, 2007 (age 19); Boulder, Colorado, U.S
- Occupation: Dancer
- Years active: 2008–present
- Known for: Dance Moms; Chicken Girls

Elliana Kathryn Walmsley (born June 23, 2007) is an American dancer. She became known for appearing in Lifetime's reality show Dance Moms.

== Early life ==
Elliana Kathryn Walmsley was born on June 23, 2007, in Boulder, Colorado, United States. In December 2008, she began dancing when she was 18 months old and has studied at several dance academies, including The Joffrey Ballet in Scottsdale, Arizona, the Michelle Latimer Academy in Centennial, Colorado, and The Millennium Dance Complex in Los Angeles.

== Career ==
=== 2016–2017: Career beginnings ===
In 2016, she joined the reality TV show Dance Moms, alongside her mother, during Season 6 as part of the ALDC mini team. After the mini team disbanded, Walmsley joined the elite team and became a permanent member of the cast during Season 7 in 2017, before leaving at the end of the year. She returned for some episodes in season 8.

In 2017, she participated in a national tour with castmate Maesi Caes to teach dance masterclasses and give solo performances. At the end of 2017, Walmsley originated the lead role of Grace in the musical Dance Divas Nutcracker, based on Cheryl Burke's book series: Dance Divas. It was performed off-Broadway from December 13 to December 17 at Theatre Row, New York City, where a portion of the money made went towards the charity "Dancers with Cancer".

In July 2018, representing the Michelle Latimer Dance Academy, Walmsley won the title of Mini Female Best Dancer at The Dance Awards in Las Vegas, Nevada.

=== 2018–present ===
In 2018, Walmsley participated in Dancing with the Stars: Juniors as a professional with Jason Maybaum and Emma Slater. In July 2019, she booked the starring role of Clara in the 2019/2020 Radio City Christmas Spectacular show alongside The Rockettes after pursuing the role for three years. In 2020, it was announced that Walmsley would star in season 7 of the Brat web-based series Chicken Girls. Walmsley has been a YouTube personality since November 2020. She has collaborated with fellow YouTubers Piper Rockelle, Emily Dobson, Lev Cameron, and Jenna Davis.

== Filmography ==
| Year | Series | Role | Notes | Ref. |
|---|---|---|---|---|
| 2016–2017, 2019 | Dance Moms | Herself | Main role (season 6–7), Recurring (season 8) | |
| 2016–2017 | JoJo's Juice | Herself | 2 episodes | |
| 2017 | TinaQ's Celebrity Interviews | Herself | 1 episode | |
| 2018 | Dancing with the Stars | Herself | 1 episode | |
| 2018 | Dancing with the Stars: Juniors | Herself | 5 episodes | |
| 2018 | To the Pointe with Kristyn Burtt | Herself | 1 episode | |
| 2018 | Crazy Ex-Girlfriend | Dancer | Episode: "Nathaniel is Irrelevant." | |
| 2018 | Boss Cheer | Sammy | Episode: "Welcome Aboard the Sinking Ship" | |
| 2020 | CollabBASH: The First and Largest Online Creator Event | Herself | 1 episode | |
| 2020 | Chicken Girls: The Docuseries | Herself | 9 episodes | |
| 2020–2023 | Chicken Girls | Claire Fitzroy | Main role (season 7–11) | |

== See also ==
- List of dancers
