= Sophia Lucia =

American dancer

- Occupations: Dancer; choreographer
- Years active: 2012–present

Sophia Lucia is an American dancer and choreographer. Described as a "phenom" by multiple media publications, she holds the Guinness World Record for most consecutive pirouettes. She is also known for her appearance on the reality television show Dance Moms.

== Early life ==
Sophia Lucia was born to mother Jackie Lucia. She is from Poway, California, United States. She began dancing at the age of two at San Diego Dance Centre, which is owned by her cousin Kristen Hibbs. Lucia moved to Arizona to train in ballet. She joined Phoenix's Master Ballet Academy in 2015 or 2016. She has also danced at Phoenix Ballet as a volunteer.

== Career ==
In January 2012, a video of Lucia performing 40 turns was uploaded to YouTube. It went viral, garnering over 800,000 views by February 2013. The video was also sent to The Ellen DeGeneres Show. Her mother recalled that a representative "called back in a week and said, 'We have to have her on the show'". Lucia performed a tap dance in the "hidden talent" portion of a February 2012 episode. She also briefly made an appearance in the reality television series Dance Moms as one of Abby Lee Miller's "replacement" dancers. In 2013, Lucia broke the Guinness World Record for most consecutive pirouettes at age 10 after completing 55 turns, surpassing Alicia Clifton's record of 36. The following year, she was named the Junior Female Best Dancer at the Dance Awards in New York City. At age 13, she portrayed the Harlequin Doll in Phoenix Ballet's production of The Nutcracker at Orpheum Theatre. In a review, Kerry Lengel of AZCentral said she played the role "with humor and aplomb".

== Public image ==
Multiple media publications have described Lucia as a "phenom". According to the magazine Dance Spirit, Lucia's rapid rise to fame was due to her "top-notch technique and unreal flexibility", as well as her appearance on Dance Moms. Her ballet teacher Rachel Sebastian stated that she exhibits the "perfect storm" of natural talent and tenacity that helps her turn well. Lengel partially credited the popularity of Phoenix Ballet's The Nutcracker to Lucia and her fame from reality television.

== Credits ==
Year	Title	Role	Notes	Ref.
2012	Shake It Up	Dancer	Episode: "Copy Kat It Up"	
2012, 2016	The Ellen DeGeneres Show	Herself	2 episodes	
2012–2013	Dance Moms	Herself	5 episodes	
2013	Dancing with the Stars	Herself	1 episode	
2013	America's Got Talent	Herself	1 episode	
2015	Nicky, Ricky, Dicky & Dawn	Russian kid	Episode: "I Want Candace"	
2015	The Nutcracker	Harlequin Doll	At Orpheum Theatre	
2016	So You Think You Can Dance	Herself	Contestant (season 13); 3 episodes	
2016	A Nutcracker Christmas	Sadie	Television film	
2022	Gummies	Cathy	Industry reading at Open Jar Studios	

== Awards ==
Award	Year	Category	Result	Ref.
The Dance Awards	2014	Junior Female Best Dancer	Won	
Guinness World Records	2013	Most consecutive contemporary dance pirouettes	Won	
Youth America Grand Prix	2016	Classical Dance – Women (Junior)	Top 12	
Youth America Grand Prix	2016	Contemporary Dance (Junior)	Won	
Youth America Grand Prix	2016	Pas de deux (Classical) (with William Jackson Beckham)	2nd place	
