= List of Dance Moms episodes =

Dance Moms is an American reality television series that began airing on Lifetime on July 13, 2011. Season 8 premiered on June 4, 2019. As of September 10, 2019, 235 episodes of Dance Moms have aired.

== Series overview ==
| Season | Episodes | Originally released | |
| Season | Episodes | First released | Last released |
|---|---|---|---|
| 1 | 13 | July 13, 2011 | October 12, 2011 |
| 2 | 28 (Note: Season 2 also included two special episodes (first, second) that were not allocated episode numbers by Lifetime.) | January 10, 2012 | September 25, 2012 |
| 3 | 39 (Note: Season 3 also included one special episode that was not allocated an episode number by Lifetime.) | January 1, 2013 | September 17, 2013 |
| 4 | 32 (Note: Season 4 also included two special episodes (first, second) that were not allocated episode numbers by Lifetime.) | January 1, 2014 | October 14, 2014 |
| 5 | 32 (Note: Season 5 also included two special episodes (first, second) that were not allocated episode numbers by Lifetime.) | January 6, 2015 | August 18, 2015 |
| 6 | 33 (Note: Season 6 also included one special episode that was not allocated an episode number by Lifetime.) | January 5, 2016 | November 22, 2016 |
| 7 | 29 (Note: Season 7 also included one special episode that was not allocated an episode number by Lifetime.) | November 29, 2016 | October 24, 2017 |
| 8 | 18 (Note: Season 8 also included three special episodes (first, second, third) that were not allocated episode numbers by Lifetime.) | June 4, 2019 | September 10, 2019 |

== Episodes ==
=== Season 1 (2011) ===
| No. overall | No. in season | Title | Original release date | US viewers (millions) |
|---|---|---|---|---|
| 1 | 1 | "The Competition Begins" | July 13, 2011 | 1.05 |
| 2 | 2 | "Wildly Inappropriate" | July 20, 2011 | 1.10 |
| 3 | 3 | "Cheerleader Blues" | July 27, 2011 | 1.05 |
| 4 | 4 | "Stealing the Show" | August 3, 2011 | 0.85 |
| 5 | 5 | "When Stars Collide" | August 10, 2011 | 0.89 |
| 6 | 6 | "Dying to Dance" | August 17, 2011 | 1.36 |
| 7 | 7 | "She's a Fighter" | August 24, 2011 | 1.38 |
| 8 | 8 | "Love on the Dance Floor" | August 31, 2011 | 1.62 |
| 9 | 9 | "From Ballerinas to Showgirls" | September 7, 2011 | 1.73 |
| 10 | 10 | "Cathy Brings It On!" | September 14, 2011 | 1.75 |
| 11 | 11 | "It All Ends Here" | September 28, 2011 | 1.51 |
| 12 | 12 | "There's Only One Star" | October 5, 2011 | 1.80 |
| 13 | 13 | "Most Outrageous Moments" | October 12, 2011 | N/A |

=== Season 2 (2012) ===
| No. overall | No. in season | Title | Original release date | US viewers (millions) |
|---|---|---|---|---|
| 14 | 1 | "Everyone's Replaceable" | January 10, 2012 | 2.51 |
| 15 | 2 | "Return of the Candy Apples" | January 17, 2012 | 2.08 |
| 16 | 3 | "Brooke's Turning Point" | January 24, 2012 | 2.50 |
| 17 | 4 | "No One Likes a Bully" | January 31, 2012 | 1.98 |
| 18 | 5 | "Brooke's Back" "Burn, Pom Poms, Burn!" | February 7, 2012 | 2.26 |
| 19 | 6 | "Jill on the Rampage" "Wardrobe Malfunction" or "The Dance Detectives" | February 14, 2012 | 2.27 |
| 20 | 7 | "Bullets and Ballet" "Flash Dance Moms" | February 21, 2012 | 2.49 |
| 21 | 8 | "The Runaway Mom" | February 28, 2012 | 2.27 |
| 22 | 9 | "Costume Drama" "Topless Showgirls" | March 6, 2012 | 2.70 |
| 23 | 10 | "Miami Heat Wave" | March 13, 2012 | 2.20 |
| 24 | 11 | "Melissa Pleads the Fifth" | March 20, 2012 | 2.35 |
| 25 | 12 | "Waiting for Joffrey" | March 27, 2012 | 2.38 |
| 26 | 13 | "Abbygeddon" | April 3, 2012 | 2.61 |
| 27 | - | "Abby's Most OMG Moments" | June 5, 2012 | 1.48 |
| 28 | 14 | "The Battle Begins" | June 5, 2012 | 2.10 |
| 29 | 15 | "Night of the Living Dancers" | June 12, 2012 | 2.02 |
| 30 | 16 | "I Know What You Did Last Competition" | June 19, 2012 | 1.84 |
| 31 | 17 | "Maddie Has a Secret" | June 26, 2012 | 2.12 |
| 32 | - | "Abby's Dance-a-Thon" | July 3, 2012 | 1.99 |
| 33 | 18 | "How Do You Like Them Apples?" | July 10, 2012 | 2.08 |
| 34 | 19 | "Worst Birthday Party Ever!" | July 17, 2012 | 1.92 |
| 35 | 20 | "Guess Who's Back?" | July 24, 2012 | 2.12 |
| 36 | 21 | "Break a Leg" | August 7, 2012 | 2.16 |
| 37 | 22 | "Revenge of the Candy Apples" | August 14, 2012 | 2.08 |
| 38 | 23 | "The Recital to End All Recitals" | August 21, 2012 | 2.39 |
| 39 | 24 | "New Girl in Town" "One Danced Over the Cuckoo's Nest" | August 28, 2012 | 2.24 |
| 40 | 25 | "Solo Fever" | September 4, 2012 | 2.30 |
| 41 | 26 | "Nationals 90210" | September 11, 2012 | 2.10 |
| 42 | 27 | "Reunion: Off the Dance Floor, Part 1" | September 18, 2012 | 1.72 |
| 43 | 28 | "Reunion: Off the Dance Floor, Part 2" | September 25, 2012 | 1.47 |

=== Season 3 (2013) ===
| No. overall | No. in season | Title | Original release date | US viewers (millions) |
|---|---|---|---|---|
| 44 | - | "The Smoke Before the Fire" | January 1, 2013 | 2.29 |
| 45 | 1 | "The Beginning of the End" | January 1, 2013 | 2.83 |
| 46 | 2 | "Out With the Old, In With the New" | January 8, 2013 | 2.53 |
| 47 | 3 | "But I'm a National Champion!" | January 15, 2013 | 2.64 |
| 48 | 4 | "Liar Liar Dance Mom on Fire!" | January 22, 2013 | 2.51 |
| 49 | 5 | "Revenge of the Replacements" "Who Won First?" | January 29, 2013 | 2.56 |
| 50 | 6 | "Boys Are Cuties, Girls Have Cooties" | February 5, 2013 | 2.33 |
| 51 | 7 | "Rotten to the Core" | February 12, 2013 | 2.59 |
| 52 | 8 | "You've Been Unfriended" | February 19, 2013 | 2.39 |
| 53 | 9 | "Bye Bye Baby" | February 26, 2013 | 2.66 |
| 54 | 10 | "All's Fair in Love and War" | March 5, 2013 | 2.19 |
| 55 | 11 | "Camouflaged Maneuvers" | March 12, 2013 | 2.07 |
| 56 | 12 | "The Apple of Her Eye" | March 19, 2013 | 2.15 |
| 57 | 13 | "She's a Maniac" | March 26, 2013 | 2.25 |
| 58 | 14 | "Watch Your Back, Mack" | April 2, 2013 | 2.34 |
| 59 | 15 | "The Politics of Dancing" | April 9, 2013 | 2.39 |
| 60 | 16 | "May I Have This Dance?" | April 16, 2013 | 2.26 |
| 61 | 17 | "The View from the Top" | April 23, 2013 | 2.26 |
| 62 | 18 | "Candy Apple Showdown" | April 30, 2013 | 1.97 |
| 63 | 19 | "Tell All, Part 1" | May 7, 2013 | 1.11 |
| 64 | 20 | "Tell All, Part 2" | May 14, 2013 | 1.37 |
| 65 | 21 | "Abby's Mother's Day Special" | May 7, 2013 | N/A |
| 66 | 22 | "Boy Crazy, Mom Crazy" | June 4, 2013 | 1.45 |
| 67 | 23 | "Two Girls, One Solo" | June 11, 2013 | 1.68 |
| 68 | 24 | "An Apple a Day Keeps Abby Away" | June 18, 2013 | 1.79 |
| 69 | 25 | "No Room for Rotten Apples" | June 25, 2013 | 1.82 |
| 70 | 26 | "Dance Moms Chatter, Part 1" | July 2, 2013 | 1.01 |
| 71 | 27 | "Dance Moms Chatter, Part 2" | July 9, 2013 | 1.04 |
| 72 | 28 | "Tap Versus Hip Hop" | July 16, 2013 | 1.76 |
| 73 | 29 | "Abby's So Far This Season" | July 22, 2013 | 1.62 |
| 74 | 30 | "Recital Rebellion" | July 23, 2013 | 1.62 |
| 75 | 31 | "Clash of the Dance Moms" | July 30, 2013 | 1.85 |
| 76 | 32 | "The Dancing Dead" | August 6, 2013 | 1.74 |
| 77 | 33 | "Gone, Abby Gone" | August 13, 2013 | 1.86 |
| 78 | 34 | "On-Again, Off-Again Abby" | August 20, 2013 | 1.94 |
| 79 | 35 | "Diva Las Vegas" | August 27, 2013 | 1.84 |
| 80 | 36 | "Do-Si-Do and Do-Si-Don't" | September 3, 2013 | 1.78 |
| 81 | 37 | "The Big, Not So, Easy" | September 10, 2013 | 1.94 |
| 82 | 38 | "Dance Moms Reunion: Hurricane Abby" | September 17, 2013 | 1.27 |
| 83 | 39 | "Dance Moms Holiday Special: Twas the Fight Before Christmas" | December 10, 2013 | 1.12 |

=== Season 4 (2014) ===
| No. overall | No. in season | Title | Original release date | US viewers (millions) |
|---|---|---|---|---|
| TBA | - | "Guess Who's Coming to the Dance?" | January 1, 2014 | 1.59 |
| 84 | 1 | "Welcome Back...Now Don't Get Too Comfy" | January 1, 2014 | 2.42 |
| 85 | 2 | "Two Can Play This Game" | January 7, 2014 | 2.17 |
| 86 | - | "Dance Moms Cares" | January 14, 2014 | 1.21 |
| 87 | 3 | "Abby Strikes Back" | January 14, 2014 | 2.00 |
| 88 | 4 | "Chloe vs. Kendall: Round 2" | January 21, 2014 | 2.01 |
| 89 | 5 | "No One Is Safe" | January 28, 2014 | 2.41 |
| 90 | 6 | "Clash of the Chloes" | February 4, 2014 | 2.02 |
| 91 | 7 | "Big Trouble in the Big Apple" | February 11, 2014 | 2.51 |
| 92 | 8 | "Wingman Down" | February 18, 2014 | 2.01 |
| 93 | 9 | "Nothing's Fair in Abbyville" | February 25, 2014 | 2.06 |
| 94 | 10 | "No Solo for You" | March 4, 2014 | 2.03 |
| 95 | 11 | "Blame It on the New Girl" | March 11, 2014 | 2.19 |
| 96 | 12 | "Sister Showdown" | March 18, 2014 | 1.94 |
| 97 | 13 | "Decisions Decisions" | March 25, 2014 | 1.99 |
| 98 | 14 | "Family Comes First" | April 1, 2014 | 1.99 |
| 99 | 15 | "Lights! Camera! Dance!" | April 8, 2014 | 1.75 |
| 100 | 16 | "Presenting My New Team" | April 15, 2014 | 2.00 |
| 101 | 17 | "Seeing Red" | April 22, 2014 | 1.63 |
| 102 | 18 | "Girl Talk" | April 29, 2014 | 1.31 |
| 103 | 19 | "The Battle of Maddie vs. Chloe" | May 13, 2014 | 0.87 |
| 104 | 20 | "Abby's Top Ten Dances" | June 24, 2014 | 1.44 |
| 105 | 21 | "Double the Moms, Double the Trouble" | July 29, 2014 | 1.44 |
| 106 | 22 | "Kiss or Get Off the Pot" | August 5, 2014 | 1.52 |
| 107 | 23 | "Three Soloists, One Star" | August 12, 2014 | 1.71 |
| 108 | 24 | "Abby-phobic" | August 19, 2014 | 1.67 |
| 109 | 25 | "Chloe Gets Revenge" | August 26, 2014 | 1.57 |
| 110 | 26 | "No More Crybabies" | September 2, 2014 | 1.55 |
| 111 | 27 | "The Understudies" | September 9, 2014 | 1.38 |
| 112 | 28 | "Another One Bites the Dust" | September 16, 2014 | 1.48 |
| 113 | 29 | "45 Second Solos" | September 23, 2014 | 1.39 |
| 114 | 30 | "Hollywood Here We Come, Part 1" | September 30, 2014 | 1.42 |
| 115 | 31 | "Hollywood Here We Come, Part 2" | October 7, 2014 | 1.61 |
| 116 | 32 | "Playing Favorites" | October 14, 2014 | 1.46 |

=== Season 5 (2015) ===
| No. overall | No. in season | Title | Original release date | US viewers (millions) |
|---|---|---|---|---|
| 117 | - | "Girl Talk 2" | January 6, 2015 | 1.42 |
| 118 | 1 | "99 Problems But a Mom Ain't One" | January 6, 2015 | 1.82 |
| 119 | 2 | "Abby Got Served" | January 13, 2015 | 1.55 |
| 120 | 3 | "JoJo with a Bow Bow" | January 20, 2015 | 1.33 |
| 121 | 4 | "Bye Bye Pittsburgh" | January 27, 2015 | 1.46 |
| 122 | 5 | "Hello Hollywood, Goodbye Abby" | February 3, 2015 | 1.52 |
| 123 | 6 | "Nia Risks It All" | February 10, 2015 | 1.68 |
| 124 | 7 | "Wild Wild West Coast, Part 1" | February 17, 2015 | 1.78 |
| 125 | 8 | "Wild Wild West Coast, Part 2" | February 24, 2015 | 1.67 |
| 126 | 9 | "The Great Divide" | March 3, 2015 | 1.42 |
| 127 | 10 | "The New Maddie?" | March 10, 2015 | 1.47 |
| 128 | 11 | "Nia's Last Chance" | March 17, 2015 | 1.59 |
| 129 | 12 | "Abby's Trash, Cathy's Treasure" | March 24, 2015 | 1.62 |
| 130 | 13 | "Mackenzie's Time to Shine" | March 31, 2015 | 1.66 |
| 131 | 14 | "Hollywood, Round Two" | April 7, 2015 | 1.54 |
| 132 | 15 | "Maddie vs. Kalani" | April 14, 2015 | 1.42 |
| 133 | 16 | "Video Killed the ALDC Star" | April 21, 2015 | 1.69 |
| 134 | 17 | "Showdown in Pittsburgh, Part 1" | April 28, 2015 | 1.62 |
| 135 | 18 | "Showdown in Pittsburgh, Part 2" | May 5, 2015 | 1.45 |
| 136 | 19 | "Seeing Stars" | May 12, 2015 | 1.20 |
| 137 | 20 | "Dance Moms Down Under, Part 1" | May 19, 2015 | 0.94 |
| 138 | 21 | "Dance Moms Down Under, Part 2" | May 26, 2015 | 1.10 |
| 139 | 22 | "Live From LA, It's Kendall K" | June 9, 2015 | 1.12 |
| 140 | 23 | "Maddie vs. Mackenzie" | June 16, 2015 | 1.03 |
| 141 | 24 | "West Coast Strikes Back" | June 23, 2015 | 1.25 |
| 142 | 25 | "Abby vs. Kira" | June 30, 2015 | 1.26 |
| 143 | 26 | "Where in the World is Abby Lee Miller?" | July 7, 2015 | 1.18 |
| 144 | 27 | "Abby vs. Kira ... AGAIN!" | July 14, 2015 | 1.36 |
| 145 | 28 | "Solo Battle: Round 1" | July 21, 2015 | 1.33 |
| 146 | 29 | "Baby Dance Mama Drama" | July 28, 2015 | 1.34 |
| 147 | 30 | "Nia vs. Kalani... Winner Takes All" | August 4, 2015 | 1.22 |
| 148 | 31 | "Chaos at Nationals" | August 11, 2015 | 1.40 |
| 149 | 32 | "City of Angels" | August 18, 2015 | 0.99 |
| 150 | - | "Slumber Party!" | August 18, 2015 | 0.58 |

=== Season 6 (2016) ===
| No. overall | No. in season | Title | Original release date | US viewers (millions) |
|---|---|---|---|---|
| 151 | - | "No Moms Allowed" | January 5, 2016 | 1.08 |
| 152 | 1 | "New Season, New Rules" | January 5, 2016 | 1.37 |
| 153 | 2 | "Abby vs. Melissa" | January 12, 2016 | 1.26 |
| 154 | 3 | "Mini Dancers, Big Drama" | January 19, 2016 | 1.38 |
| 155 | 4 | "Now You See Abby, Now You Don't" | January 26, 2016 | 1.34 |
| 156 | 5 | "Abby's Replaceable" | February 2, 2016 | 1.47 |
| 157 | 6 | "Abby's New Favorites" | February 9, 2016 | 1.41 |
| 158 | 7 | "Debbie Allen to the Rescue" | February 16, 2016 | 1.45 |
| 159 | 8 | "Maddie Is Back" | February 23, 2016 | 1.32 |
| 160 | 9 | "Nia Saves the Day" | March 1, 2016 | 1.29 |
| 161 | 10 | "Abby Lee Horror Story" | March 8, 2016 | 1.21 |
| 162 | 11 | "The Maddie Rumor" | March 15, 2016 | 1.25 |
| 163 | 12 | "Brynn's Big Moment" | March 22, 2016 | 1.39 |
| 164 | 13 | "ALDC Does Vegas" | March 29, 2016 | 1.51 |
| 165 | 14 | "JoJo Steals the Show Show" | April 5, 2016 | 1.42 |
| 166 | 15 | "Melissa's Announcement" | April 12, 2016 | 1.66 |
| 167 | 16 | "Mack Z vs. Abby Lee" | April 19, 2016 | 1.40 |
| 168 | 17 | "Mini Madness" | April 26, 2016 | 1.27 |
| 169 | 18 | "One Last Dance" | May 3, 2016 | 1.41 |
| 174 | 19 | "Abby's New Beginning" | September 6, 2016 | 0.96 |
| 175 | 20 | "Nia & Kendall Face Off" | September 13, 2016 | 0.88 |
| 176 | 21 | "Return of the Minis" | September 20, 2016 | 0.73 |
| 177 | 22 | "Mommy Meltdown" | September 27, 2016 | 0.81 |
| 178 | 23 | "Mini Mayhem" | October 4, 2016 | 0.92 |
| 179 | 24 | "Abby, You're Fired!" | October 11, 2016 | 0.89 |
| 180 | 25 | "JoJo is a No Show" | October 18, 2016 | 0.83 |
| 181 | 26 | "ALDC For Sale?" | October 25, 2016 | 0.78 |
| 182 | 27 | "Float Like a Butterfly, Sting Like Ab-bee" | November 1, 2016 | 0.75 |
| 183 | 28 | "Two Teams, Two Studios Part 1" | November 15, 2016 | 0.92 |
| 184 | 29 | "Two Teams, Two Studios Part 2" | November 22, 2016 | 0.81 |

=== Season 7 (2016–17) ===
| No. overall | No. in season | Title | Original release date | US viewers (millions) |
|---|---|---|---|---|
| 185 | 1 | "Fight for Your Life" | November 29, 2016 | 1.03 |
| 186 | 2 | "Abby's Worst Nightmare" | December 6, 2016 | 1.04 |
| 187 | 3 | "Return of the Rotten Apples" | December 13, 2016 | 0.90 |
| 188 | 4 | "Winner Takes All" | December 20, 2016 | 1.04 |
| 189 | 5 | "New Kid on the Block" | December 27, 2016 | 0.87 |
| 190 | 6 | "No Clowning Around" | January 3, 2017 | 1.09 |
| 191 | 7 | "The Fresno Curse" | January 10, 2017 | 1.07 |
| 192 | 8 | "ALDC Ain't Dead Yet" | January 17, 2017 | 0.96 |
| 193 | 9 | "Battle of the Blondes" | January 24, 2017 | 1.00 |
| 194 | 10 | "Breathless In Denver" | January 31, 2017 | 1.10 |
| 195 | 11 | "Leaving La La Land" | February 7, 2017 | 0.88 |
| 196 | 12 | "It's Not Always Sunny in Pittsburgh" | February 14, 2017 | 0.96 |
| 197 | 13 | "Same Old Frenemies, Part 1" | February 21, 2017 | 1.19 |
| 198 | 14 | "Same Old Frenemies, Part 2" | February 21, 2017 | 1.23 |
| 199 | - | "Abby Tells All" | July 25, 2017 | 0.93 |
| 200 | 15 | "Judgement Day Approaches" | August 1, 2017 | 0.73 |
| 201 | 16 | "Abby Flies The Coop" | August 8, 2017 | 0.67 |
| 202 | 17 | "Out With Abby, In With Chloe - Part 1" | August 15, 2017 | 0.79 |
| 203 | 18 | "Out With Abby, In With Chloe - Part 2" | August 22, 2017 | 0.78 |
| 204 | 19 | "All Choked Up" | August 29, 2017 | 0.76 |
| 205 | 20 | "Stamina, Stamina, Stamina" | September 5, 2017 | 0.65 |
| 206 | 21 | "Ashlee's Big Decision Part 1" | September 12, 2017 | 0.77 |
| 207 | 22 | "Ashlee's Big Decision Part 2" | September 19, 2017 | 0.75 |
| 208 | 23 | "There's A New Team in Town Part 1" | October 3, 2017 | 0.77 |
| 209 | 24 | "There's A New Team in Town Part 2" | October 10, 2017 | 0.77 |
| 210 | 25 | "Everyone's Replaceable... Even Abby" | October 17, 2017 | 0.75 |
| 211 | 26 | "Under Cheryl's Spell" | October 24, 2017 | 0.80 |
| 212 | 27 | "The Best Is Yet To Come" | October 24, 2017 | 0.78 |
| 213 | 28 | "Abby's Last Dance" | October 24, 2017 | 0.51 |
| 214 | 29 | "Chloe & Christi's Encore" | October 24, 2017 | 0.31 |

=== Season 8 (2019) ===
| No. overall | No. in season | Title | Original release date | US viewers (millions) |
|---|---|---|---|---|
| 215 | - | "The New Team" | June 4, 2019 | N/A |
| 216 | - | "The Return of Abby" | June 4, 2019 | N/A |
| 217 | 1 | "Abby's Big Comeback" | June 4, 2019 | N/A |
| 218 | 2 | "Mommy Dearest" | June 4, 2019 | N/A |
| 219 | 3 | "The Broadway Brat" | June 11, 2019 | N/A |
| 220 | 4 | "Choose Wisely" | June 18, 2019 | N/A |
| 221 | 5 | "Queen of the ALDC" | June 25, 2019 | N/A |
| 222 | 6 | "Lilly's Ultimatum" | July 2, 2019 | N/A |
| 223 | 7 | "Yolanda's Back" | July 9, 2019 | N/A |
| 224 | 8 | "A Team On Trial" | July 16, 2019 | N/A |
| 225 | 9 | "Making a Splash in Pittsburgh" | July 23, 2019 | N/A |
| 226 | 10 | "No More Mamma Drama" | July 30, 2019 | 0.53 |
| 227 | 11 | "Hannah Unmasked" | August 6, 2019 | 0.60 |
| 228 | 12 | "2 Jackets, 4 Dancers" | August 13, 2019 | 0.62 |
| 229 | 13 | "Abby's Audition" | August 20, 2019 | 0.62 |
| 230 | 14 | "The Return of Studio 19" | August 20, 2019 | 0.58 |
| 231 | 15 | "Rise From the Ashes" | August 27, 2019 | 0.69 |
| 232 | 16 | "New York Nationals" | August 27, 2019 | 0.65 |
| 233 | 17 | "Reunion: Return of the ALDC" | September 3, 2019 | 0.38 |
| 234 | - | "Unseen Dances, Untold Stories" | September 3, 2019 | 0.28 |
| 235 | 18 | "Reunion: Kids Tell All" | September 10, 2019 | 0.21 |
