= Raising Asia =

- Genre: Reality
- Starring: Asia Monet Ray; Bella Blu Ray; Kristie Ray; Shawn Ray
- Country of origin: United States
- Original language: English
- No. of seasons: 1
- No. of episodes: 13

Production
- Running time: 30 minutes

Original release
- Network: Lifetime
- Release: July 29 – September 9, 2014

Raising Asia is an American reality television series that debuted on Lifetime on July 29, 2014. This series is a spin-off of Dance Moms. It follows the daily life of Asia Monet Ray, a then eight-year-old dancer, and her family. The show focuses mainly on Asia's career as a dancer and the repercussions fame can have on a family.

== Synopsis ==
Raising Asia features Asia Monet Ray and follows both her singing and dancing career. This show also brings to light many of the other activities and performances Asia participates in. The series captures the day-to-day life of the Ray family and how they raise an eight-year-old celebrity. The series aired on Lifetime.

== Cast ==
- Asia Monet Ray is a dancer, singer, student, actress, and gymnast. She has appeared on the shows Dance Moms and Abby's Ultimate Dance Competition.
- Kristie Ray, a former fitness model is Asia's mother. She has appeared on the shows Dance Moms and Abby's Ultimate Dance Competition alongside her daughter.
- Shawn Ray, a Hall of Fame Bodybuilder, is Asia's father.
- Bella Blu Ray is Asia's younger sister. She herself is a dancer and a gymnast.
- Anthony Burrell is Asia's main choreographer.
- Billy Hufsey is Asia's manager.
- Gina Alvarado-Samperio is Asia's aunt and Kristie's sister.

== Episodes ==
| No. | Title | Original release date |
|---|---|---|
| 1 | "The Lion Tamer and the Tiger Mom" | July 29, 2014 |
The Ray family revolves around eight-year old daughter Asia’s rising star, and this week there’s a huge performance at World of Dance on the line. Questions about the suitability of the choreography put the entire performance in jeopardy. Meanwhile, Asia’s parents struggle with their own balancing act.
| 2 | "Diva Days, Red Carpet Nights" | August 5, 2014 |
This week, Asia is slated to perform at the Reality TV Awards, but tensions are already running high in the Ray household. When Kristie isn’t happy with the stage, she tries to pull the plug. Meanwhile, Shawn confronts Asia’s manager, Billy.
| 3 | "The Education of Asia Ray" | August 5, 2014 |
Asia's training goes into high gear, and with Shawn out of town, Kristie is overwhelmed–until her mother arrives to lend a hand. But while Kristie may be happy for the help, she's less than thrilled by some unsolicited advice–and an attempted intervention.
| 4 | "Managers and Mayhem" | August 12, 2014 |
Asia ramps up her training as an actress, singer and dancer, but choreographer Anthony questions whether manager Billy is the right person to take Asia to the top. Anthony's doubts grow stronger when he hears the new song Billy wrote for Asia and decides to spring a surprise meeting with another manager on Kristie–and she is not happy about it! Meanwhile, Kristie tries to figure out how to fit in more time with Bella, who is feeling left out.
| 5 | "It's (Not) My Party and I'll Cry if I Want To" | August 12, 2014 |
It's Bella's birthday and Kristie is determined to focus on her, while Asia struggles with the sacrifices she's forced to make for her career. Shawn removes Kristie from Asia's rehearsal with Anthony. Later, Kristie stuns everyone by announcing that she and Asia must leave Bella's birthday party for a photo shoot.
| 6 | "What Would Beyoncé Do?" | August 19, 2014 |
Billy lands Asia a gig opening for a pop star that no one has heard of and things quickly go south once they arrive at venue, only to discover it is a 21 and over nightclub. While Asia is forced to prepare in a tent in the middle of a parking lot, Anthony blames Billy for all of the issues, causing a major rift between Shawn and Kristie.
| 7 | "Hit the Road" | August 19, 2014 |
Asia is heading to Las Vegas for her singing and dancing debut at Planet Hollywood. Anthony and Billy nearly come to blows as they continue to fight for control over Asia’s career. After his missteps with last week’s performance, Billy has to redeem himself in Shawn’s eyes if he wants to stay on the team.
| 8 | "Billy's Last Chance" | August 26, 2014 |
It's Billy's big chance to prove that he has the chops to take Asia to the next level, but a major meltdown from Asia before her first singing performance at Planet Hollywood threatens to derail everything they've been working towards.
| 9 | "Eyes on the Pride" | August 26, 2014 |
Anthony is determined to have full creative control over Asia's performance at the Long Beach Pride Festival. But after missing rehearsals, arguing with Shawn, and disobeying orders, Anthony is on thin ice. During a fraught rehearsal, Anthony drops Asia on her tailbone.
| 10 | "Dad-ager" | September 2, 2014 |
Choreographer Ricky Palomino has given Asia the lead role in his theatrical performance titled "Daylight Come." Meanwhile, Shawn decides to handle Asia's career for a week while Kristie takes on Bella's responsibilities.
| 11 | "Three Men and a Maybe" | September 2, 2014 |
Billy books a performance for Asia at R&B legend El DeBarge’s birthday. Shawn puts Anthony in charge of vetoing this performance if he feels that Asia is not ready. Anthony feels empowered, but Shawn ultimately pulls rank. When Anthony explodes in frustration, both the performance as well as his place on Team Asia are put in jeopardy.
| 12 | "Of Momagers and Meltdowns" | September 9, 2014 |
Asia prepares to sing her new ballad on the web series, BiteSizeTV. As the pressure mounts, she loses focus and spins out of control just before show time. Gina confides in Shawn that she feels unappreciated, leading Kristie to explode at the crew and threaten to pull the plug on Raising Asia.
| 13 | "Make It or Break It" | September 9, 2014 |
It's time for Asia to take the stage at Universal CityWalk for the biggest and most important performance of her life. As she goes through her final performance run-through, a technical glitch threatens to ruin her day.
