= Brave New Girl (novel) =

2001 novel by Louisa Luna

- Author: Louisa Luna
- Language: English
- Publisher: MTV Books
- Publication date: January 30, 2001
- Publication place: United States
- Media type: Print (paperback)
- Pages: 208 pages
- ISBN: 0-7434-0786-5
- OCLC: 45965277
- LC Class: CPB Box no. 1909 vol. 1

Brave New Girl is the first novel by Louisa Luna. It was published by MTV Books in early 2001. The book was written by Luna when she was at New York University.

The novel tracks the adolescent angst of the protagonist, Doreen Severna, who is comparable to the character Holden Caulfield from The Catcher in the Rye. The story takes place in Pasadena, California, the summer before Doreen's freshman year in high school.

Doreen is a fourteen-year-old outcast with only one friend, the equally marginalized Ted. The two share an intense love of music (mainly The Pixies) and knowledge of what it's like to be alienated.

The novel's title is a play on Aldous Huxley's Brave New World — a title which is itself drawn from William Shakespeare's The Tempest, act V, scene I.
