= Collins Avenue Productions =

American television production company

Collins Avenue Entertainment
- Industry: Reality Television
- Genre: Television Production Company
- Founded: 2008
- Founder: Jeff Collins
- Headquarters: Los Angeles, California, United States
- Website: CollinsAve.com

Collins Avenue (CollinsAve) was an American television production company founded by entertainment executive Jeff Collins. Working in a partnership arrangement with the London-based Content Media Corporation (formerly ContentFilm Group), CollinsAve produces reality programs in the U.S. with international distribution support from a partner company, Content Television (formerly Fireworks Entertainment). After Collins left the company before it was acquired by the Content Group in January 2020, the Content Group rebranded Collins Avenue Entertainment as Story Street Entertainment.

== Television Productions ==
CollinsAve primarily produces television content for networks in the US, including The CW Network, TLC, Lifetime, A&E, Country Music Television, Destination America, E!, Food Network, National Geographic Channel, Spike, WE TV, VH1, and Animal Planet.

In January 2010, CollinsAve established an innovative partnership with Virgin America Airlines to create one of the first primetime network docuseries - Fly Girls. The series aired March 24, 2010 on the CW Television Network and follows five airline attendants throughout both their professional and personal lives working for the young, high-quality airline started in 2007 by Sir Richard Branson.

In February 2011, TLC aired Outrageous Kid Parties. Outrageous Kid Parties follows parents who spend incredible amounts of money to throw over-the-top birthday celebrations for their young children.

On July 13, 2011 Dance Moms premiered on Lifetime. Set in Pittsburgh's Abby Lee Dance Company, owned and operated by Abby Lee Miller, Dance Moms follows eight children’s early steps on the road to stardom.

Other shows Collins Avenue has produced include American Stuffers for Animal Planet, The Drama Queen for E!, Ice Moms, Dance Moms: Miami, Dance Moms Chatter, and Abby's Ultimate Dance Competition for Lifetime, American Colony: Meet the Hutterites, Mennonite Made, and Anger Management for the National Geographic Channel, and Dance Showdown, Season 3 by D-Trix, broadcast via YouTube.

On April 2, 2012, Collins Avenue was named one of Realscreen's Top 100, and is featured on the Realscreen website.
