= Brit Smith =

American singer (born 1985)

- Also known as: Matisse (2009–2012)
- Born: Brittany Smith; December 3, 1985 (age 40)
- Origin: Wilton, Connecticut, U.S.
- Genres: Pop; R&B
- Occupations: Singer; actress
- Years active: 1991–2013, 2024–present
- Labels: Interscope; Jive; RCA
- Formerly of: Brit & Alex

Brittany Smith (born December 3, 1985), formerly known as Matisse, is an American singer. She gained prominence from a young age as one half of a modeling duo with her identical twin sister Alex, appearing in various commercials. They later went on to pursue a music career and form the pop duo Brit & Alex, who were active from 2002 until their 2009 disbandment.

As a solo artist, Smith released her debut single "Better Than Her" in 2010, which topped the US Dance Airplay charts. She later signed with Interscope Records to release her 2013 single, "Provocative (hiDhi)" (featuring will.i.am). Due to the song underperforming, Smith decided to leave the music industry. Following the release of JoJo Siwa's single "Karma" in April 2024, a version of the song recorded by Smith titled "Karma's a Bitch" went viral across social media platforms; she subsequently announced plans to return to the music industry.

== Career ==
Smith began appearing on TV at six months of age on One Life to Live. By the age of 15, she was a spokesmodel for the haircare brand John Frieda and signed to The Ford Agency. During this tenure she and identical twin sister Alexia formed the pop duo Brit & Alex, where they became famous for appearing in TV commercials for John Freida's Sheer Blonde line (where they would be known to fans as "The Sheer Blonde Twins") and later signed with Interscope Records. They also went to England in the hopes of establishing a musical career there, but would achieve little success, having reached number 75 on the UK Singles Chart with "Let It Go" in 2008.

After the duo broke up in 2009 due to Alex's decision to go to college, Brittany continued with her singing and acting career, signing with Jive Records and recording under the name Matisse, naming herself after the French painter. In 2010, Smith released her first single "Better Than Her" featuring Akon under Matisse. It was written and produced by Kevin Rudolf and Jacob Kasher and reached number one on Billboard's Hot Dance Airplay chart. She was working on a self-titled full-length LP (Matisse) that was to be released in 2011. Smith was signed to Jive Records. On October 7, 2011, labels such as J Records and Arista were sold to Sony's Flagship Label, and all artists were merged to sign to RCA Records and other affiliated Sony Music Labels. Therefore, Smith was merged to sign to RCA in 2011; she signed with Interscope.

In July 2011, Smith, as Matisse, released a medley of Rihanna songs on YouTube. The video was produced by Kurt Hugo Schneider.

In 2013, Smith released "Provocative" featuring will.i.am. Betty White appears in the music video.

=== "Karma's a Bitch" ===
In April 2024, American singer JoJo Siwa released a song titled "Karma". The song went viral and received negative feedback. This then led to a re-uploading of an unreleased version recorded by Smith in 2012. The little-seen video featured animations by Super77 and had been uploaded to Vimeo for their portfolio since March 20, 2013. Smith's version of the song was praised online, which led to Smith officially releasing the song across all streaming platforms on April 13. In an interview with Page Six, Smith revealed that the song was originally intended to be her debut single; however, her label changed plans last minute.

Shortly after "Karma's a Bitch" out-charted Siwa's version on iTunes in the United States in April 2024, Smith shared that she is returning to the music industry via an announcement of her upcoming EP, scheduled to debut on May 17, 2024. On April 30, 2024, it was announced that Smith had signed the "Karma's a Bitch" single to the independent record label and music distributor Broke Records. On May 17, 2024, Smith announced that the release of her EP had been delayed. She also revealed that she would be releasing the single "Chocolates and Lies" that same day. The single "Chocolates and Lies" was released the next day on May 18, 2024.

== Discography ==
=== Singles ===
List of singles, showing year released, chart positions and album name
Title	Year	Peak chart positions					Album
Title	Year	US Digital	US Dance	US Dance Airplay	US Dance/ Club	UK Digital	Album
"Better Than Her" (Note: Released as Matisse) (solo or remix featuring Akon)	2010	—	—	1	9	—	Non-album singles
"Provocative (hiDhi)" (featuring will.i.am)	2013	—	—	—	—	—	Non-album singles
"Karma's a Bitch"	2024	12	18	—	*	40	Non-album singles
"Chocolates and Lies"	2024	—	—	—	*	—	Non-album singles
"—" denotes songs which did not chart in that country. "*" denotes the chart did not exist at that time.

== Filmography ==
Film roles
Year	Title	Role	Note
1995	A Goofy Movie	Photo Studio Girl	Voice role
1996	Pinocchio's Revenge	Zoe Garrick	
1997	Just in Time	Lily Bedford	
1999	Treasure of Pirate's Point	Flame	
1999	Fly Boy	Janey	

Television roles
Year	Title	Role	Note
1991	Dynasty: The Reunion	Lauren Colby	TV miniseries
1994, 1997	Renegade	Amelia / Charlie Philips	2 episodes
1994-95	Empty Nest	Shanna	2 episodes
1996	Something So Right	Girl / Goblin	2 episodes
1997	Beyond Belief: Fact or Fiction	Alice	1 episode
1997	Night Man	Maddie Farrell	1 episode
1997	Chicago Hope	Jessica Walters	1 episode
1999	V.I.P.	Amelia Zane	1 episode
