= Jaymie =

Jaymie is a male given name. Notable people with this name include:

- Jaymie Graham (born 1983), Australian rules football player
- Jaymie Haycocks (born 1983), English squash player
- Jaymie Ireland, drummer of English band Ooberman
- Jaymie Jones, member of American band Mulberry Lane
- Jaymie Matthews (born 1958), Canadian astrophysicist, asteroseismologist, and populariser of science
- Jaymie Icke, English conspiracy theorist who is the son of former football broadcaster and conspiracy theorist David Icke
