= Brisbane Entertainment Centre =

Multi-purpose arena in Queensland, Australia

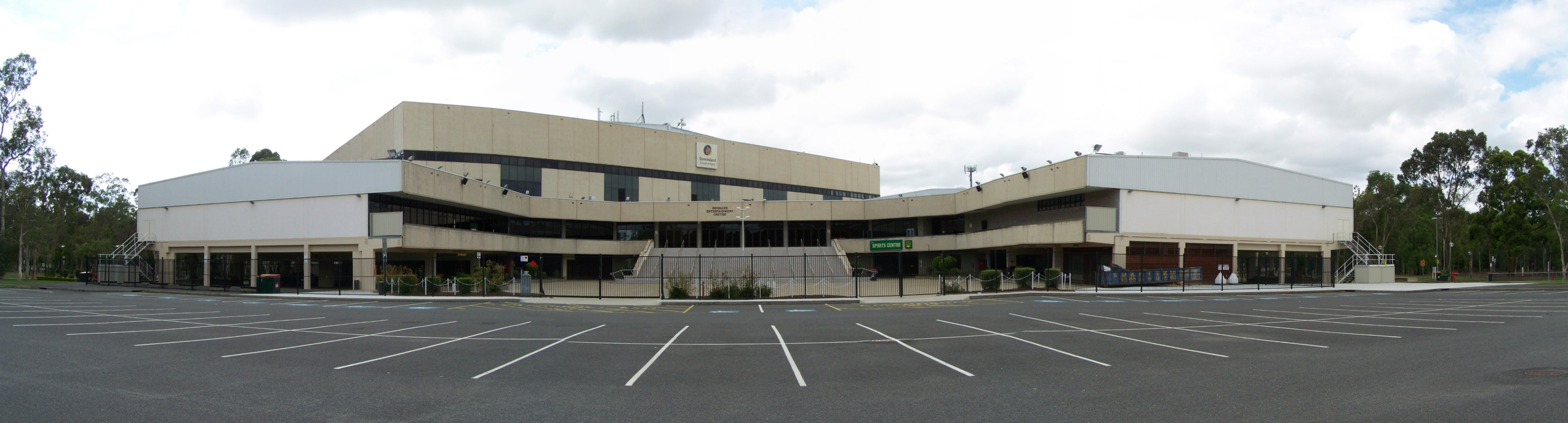
- Panoramic view of arena (c. 2012)
- Address: 1 Melaleuca Drive
- Location: Brisbane, Queensland, Australia
- Coordinates: 27°20′32″S 153°4′16″E
- Owner: Stadiums Queensland
- Operator: ASM Global
- Capacity: 14,500 (concerts); 11,000 (seated capacity)

Construction
- Groundbreaking: 1985
- Opened: 20 February 1986
- Cost: A$71 million (A$205 million in 2018 dollars)
- Builder: Watpac

Tenants
- Brisbane Bullets (NBL) (1986–97, 2007, 2016–19, 2024–present); Queensland Firebirds (ANZ/NNL) (2008–18)

Website
- brisent.com.au

The Brisbane Entertainment Centre is a multi-purpose indoor arena and concert venue located in Boondall, in the northern suburbs of Brisbane, Australia. The facility also houses a sporting complex and small function rooms which are available to hire for wedding receptions and business functions. The centre is managed by ASM Global.

The centre's large audience capacity is mostly used for the staging of concerts and musical theatre shows. It has also staged ice-skating shows, including Disney On Ice. The Entertainment Centre was also the filming venue for all three series of the original Australian series of Gladiators in 1995.

== History ==
The Brisbane Entertainment Centre was built by the Brisbane City Council opened on Thursday 20 February 1986 with the first event being ice dancers Torvill and Dean. On 1 July 2002, the ownership was transferred to Stadiums Queensland. It has been operated since 1986 by ASM Global (formerly AEG Ogden Brisbane Pty Ltd).

== Location and access ==
Located in Boondall, just off the Gateway Motorway, patrons can catch a Queensland Rail City network service to Boondall railway station, on the Shorncliffe railway line, or travel by taxi. There are 4,000 car parking spaces. Buses do not run to the centre even on event nights.

== Venue layout ==
Seating plans
Venue	Capacity
Standard Mode 1	10,021
Standard Mode 2	7,847
Standard Mode 3	13,601
In The Round	13,341
Intimate Mode 1	3,167
Intimate Mode 2	4,456
Intimate Mode 3	5,322
Intimate Mode 4	6,502
Sports Mode 1	6,799
Sports Mode 2	8,974
Sports Mode 3	5,032
Sports Mode 4	10,023

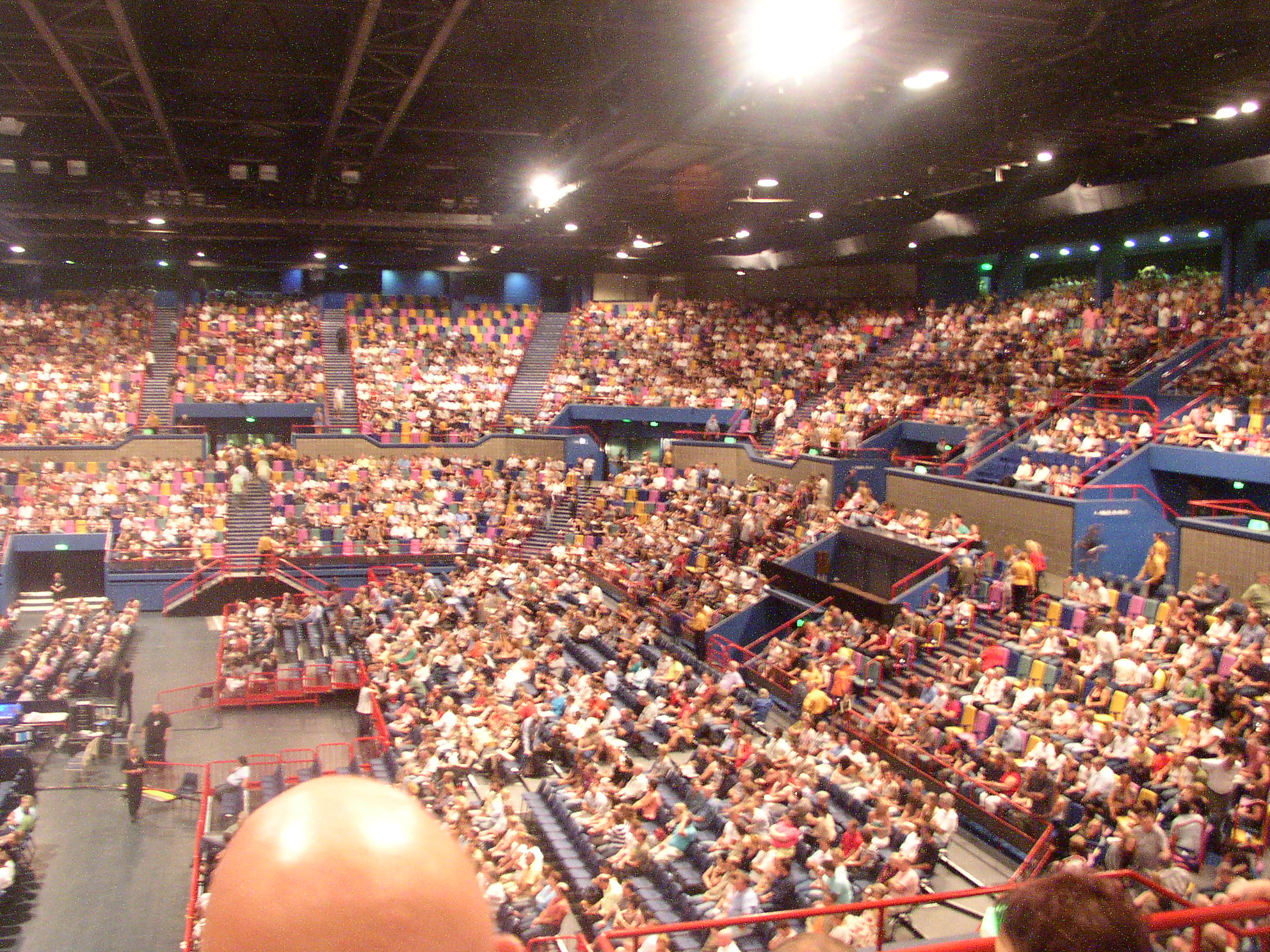
The Centre's arena (February 2007)

The centre has 11,000 tiered seats and a maximum concert capacity of 13,601 making it the largest indoor live entertainment arena in Brisbane and the second largest permanent indoor arena in Australia behind only the 21,000 capacity Sydney Super Dome (it is smaller than the 14,820 seat Rod Laver Arena and the 14,856 seat Perth Arena, though both of those venues have a retractable roof). It cost $71 million to construct.

The arena has an array of seating plans which facilitate the comfort of its users, subject to performance. Specific seating plans are usually allocated, depending on the performance and the size of its audience. The general seating arrangements are end stage mode, "in the round" and intimate mode, which only uses half of the arena.

== Sports ==
=== Brisbane Bullets ===
From 1986 to 1997, the BEC was home to former National Basketball League Australia (NBL) team the Brisbane Bullets.

The Bullets won the 1987 NBL championship against the Perth Wildcats, and secured their second NBL championship at this venue as they completed a two-game sweep of the Wildcats 2–0 after winning the first game which was played at the Perth Superdome.

In 1987, the Brisbane Bullets won their second NBL championship and their first at the Entertainment Centre with a 2–0 series win over the Perth Wildcats (the Bullets previous championship win in 1985 was at the Sleeman Sports Centre).

In 1990, the Brisbane Bullets hosted games 2 and 3 of the National Basketball League Grand Final series against the Perth Wildcats, setting a new NBL attendance record for the time in Australia of 13,221 for game 2.

In 2007, the Brisbane Bullets won their third and last NBL championship when they defeated the Melbourne Tigers 3–1 in their best of five-game series. The Entertainment Centre was used due to a date clash with the Bullets then home, the Brisbane Convention & Exhibition Centre.

The Brisbane Bullets returned to the NBL in 2016–17 and played some games at the BEC. In the 2024–25 season, the Bullets made the BEC their full-time home.

=== Queensland Firebirds ===
The venue was the main home court for netball side the Queensland Firebirds, who won premierships in the ANZ Championship at the venue in 2015 and 2016. In 2019, the club moved all of their home matches to the newly constructed venue dedicated to netball, Brisbane Arena.

=== Other ===
The facility co-hosted the FIBA Oceania Championship in 2007 and 2011. Both times, the Australian national basketball team won the gold medal.

On 15 February 2025, All Elite Wrestling held their Grand Slam television special for the first time outside the United States along with Ring of Honor's first show in Australia with Global Wars Australia.

== Notable events ==
The opening event for the centre was on 20 February 1986, featuring world champion British ice skaters Torvill and Dean.

In 1987, Michael Jackson performed during his Bad Tour for two sold-out shows on 27 and 28 November. On the 28th, Stevie Wonder appeared on stage and sang with Jackson.

The October 9, 2000 edition of WCW Nitro, the flagship programme of World Championship Wrestling, was filmed at the venue during a tour of Australia by the promotion.

Beyoncé has performed there many times, notably in 2002 and 2005 as a member of Destiny's Child, and then in 2007, 2009, and 2013 as a solo artist for her world tours The Beyoncé Experience, I Am... Tour and The Mrs Carter Show World Tour. She has officially sold over 50,000 tickets and grossed over 7 millions dollars at the venue.

On January 13, 2007, comedy rock duo Tenacious D performed as part of their Pick of Destiny Tour.

Lady Gaga performed for more than 31,000 fans over a series of three sold-out shows in June 2012 as part of the Oceanic leg of her Born This Way Ball Tour (2012–2013). She had previously performed at the venue in March 2010 as part of The Monster Ball Tour (2009–2011) and later performed at the venue again in August 2014 as part of artRave: The ARTPOP Ball Tour (2014).

American singer Chris Brown performed at the arena as part of his F.A.M.E. Tour.

American singer and dancer JoJo Siwa performed at the centre as part of the opening nights of the 2020 leg of her D.R.E.A.M. The Tour, on January 10 and 11.

American singer-songwriter Billie Eilish performed at the venue from 17 September 2022 to 19 September 2022 as part of her Happier Than Ever Tour. Eilish returned to the centre for her Hit Me Hard and Soft: The Tour, performing on February 18, 19, 21 and 22 February, as part of the opening nights of the 2025 leg of said tour.

American pop singer P!NK is the highest selling solo artist in the Centre’s history. In 2009 the P!NK Ladies Door 6 Female toilets were officially opened by P!NK herself to commemorate this outstanding achievement.

American rock band Linkin Park played two shows on March 3rd and 5th in 2026 for their From Zero World Tour. They previously played at the venue on 22 October 2007 as part of the Minutes to Midnight World Tour, and again on 3 December 2010 as part of the A Thousand Suns World Tour.

mgk came to the arena on April 16, 2026 on his Lost Americana Tour.

== See also ==
- Popular entertainment in Brisbane
- List of indoor arenas in Australia
