= The J Team =

2021 American family musical drama film

- Official release poster
- Directed by: Michael Lembeck
- Written by: Eydie Faye
- Produced by: JoJo Siwa; Eydie Faye; Ronald "Ron" Fench; Donald "Don" Dunn; Syrinthia Studer
- Starring: JoJo Siwa; Tisha Campbell; Laura Soltis; Julia Marley; Kerrynton Jones; Kiara T. Romero; Alaysia Jackson
- Cinematography: Thomas M. Harting
- Edited by: Tod Modisett
- Music by: Gabriel Mann
- Production companies: Nickelodeon Movies; JoJo Siwa Inc.
- Distributed by: Paramount+ (United States); Nickelodeon (EMEA)
- Release date: September 3, 2021 (United States)
- Running time: 85 minutes
- Country: United States
- Language: English

The J Team is a 2021 American family musical drama film directed by Michael Lembeck, executive-produced by JoJo Siwa and produced by Nickelodeon Movies which debuted as an original film on Paramount+ on September 3, 2021.

== Premise ==
JoJo Siwa is part of a dance troupe that was run by Val (Laura Soltis). When Val retires, she is replaced by the strict Coach Poppy (Tisha Campbell) who brings about harsh rules and kicks JoJo out of her troupe after she fails to live up to her expectations. While rediscovering dancing and friendship, JoJo meets other dancers as they form a dance troupe called the J Team.

== Cast ==
- JoJo Siwa as a fictional version of herself
  - Marley Winton as young JoJo Siwa
- Tisha Campbell as Coach Poppy, a strict and sparkle-hating dance coach who kicks JoJo out of the dance troupe she now runs
  - Kiyoko Rain Gordon as young Coach Poppy
- Laura Soltis as Val, JoJo's former dance coach and Coach Poppy's predecessor
- Julia Marley as Nina
- Kerrynton Jones as Ruby M., one of JoJo's best friends
- Kiara T. Romero as Ruby D., one of JoJo's best friends
- Kenya Jordan as Pepper
- Kyra Leroux as Jess
- Mya Lowe as Sunshine
- Marlow Percival as Desi
- Chris Francisque as Mr. Melody
- Clay St. Thomas as Announcer

== Production ==
In February 2020, it was reported that a JoJo Siwa film project was in the works at Nickelodeon. In February 2021, Siwa announced on The Tonight Show that title of the project was The J Team, and that she was to star and produce the film. It was also announced that an original soundtrack, including six songs written by Siwa, would be released alongside the film, and that filming would begin that month, in Vancouver, British Columbia, Canada. The film was choreographed by Heather Laura Gray and was nominated for the first ever Children's and Family Emmy Awards for Outstanding Choreography.

== Soundtrack ==
The J Team (Original Motion Picture Soundtrack)

Soundtrack album by JoJo Siwa
- Released: August 27, 2021
- Recorded: 2020
- Genre: Dance-pop
- Length: 24:57
- Label: Republic
- Producer: Matthew Tishler

JoJo Siwa chronology
| JoJo's Rockin' Christmas (2020) | The J Team (Original Motion Picture Soundtrack) (2021) | Guilty Pleasure (2024) |

The eponymous soundtrack album of the film was released through Republic Records on 27 August 2021.

All songs are produced by Matthew Tishler and performed by JoJo Siwa.

| No. | Title | Writer(s) | Length |
|---|---|---|---|
| 1. | "Dance Through the Day" | Andrew Underberg, Jeannie Lurie, JoJo Siwa, Matthew Tishler | 2:35 |
| 2. | "One Chance" | Gus Ross, Luke Eisner, Underberg, Siwa, Tishler | 2:26 |
| 3. | "Only Getting Better" (J Team Edition) | Underberg, Lurie, Siwa, Tishler | 2:24 |
| 4. | "Outta the Park" | Underberg, Lurie, Siwa, Tishler | 2:15 |
| 5. | "U-N-I" | Underberg, Lurie, Siwa, Tishler | 2:27 |
| 6. | "Back to That Girl" | Underberg, Lurie, Siwa, Tishler | 2:48 |
| 7. | "Nobody Can Change Me!" | Underberg, Ross, Lurie, Siwa, Eisner, Tishler | 3:37 |
| 8. | "D.R.E.A.M" (J Team Edition) | Ali Dee Theodore, Anthony Mirabella, Doug Davis, James Keith Petrie, Jodie Shihadeh, Nikki Ann Sorentino, Susan Paroff, Siwa | 2:42 |
| 9. | "Nobody Can Change Me!" (J Team Movie Version) | Underberg, Ross, Lurie, Siwa, Eisner, Tishler | 3:39 |

=== Performance controversy ===
A week after the film's debut on September 15, Siwa called out Nickelodeon on social media for preventing her from performing any songs from the film on the 2022 edition of her D.R.E.A.M. Tour, claiming that she is "treated as only a brand" by the company. The situation has been described as similar to that of Miley Cyrus, Demi Lovato and Selena Gomez, all of whom were signed to a major children's television network at a young age.

== Release ==
A one-minute trailer for the film was released on July 27, 2021. A drive-in premiere screening of the film was held at the Rose Bowl in Pasadena, California on September 3, 2021, releasing exclusively on Paramount+ the same day. The movie aired on Nickelodeon on November 7, 2021, as well as on TeenNick. The film was also released on DVD on July 12, 2022. Also the film had its television premiere on Nickelodeon across Europe, the Middle East and Africa. In February 2023, the film was silently removed from Paramount+.
