= Lip Sync Battle Shorties =

US television program

- Genre: Reality
- Written by: Mitchell Marchand
- Directed by: Chris Power
- Presented by: Nick Cannon; JoJo Siwa
- Composer: Jack Rayner
- Country of origin: United States
- Original language: English
- No. of seasons: 2
- No. of episodes: 20

Production
- Executive producers: Casey Patterson; Jay Peterson; John Krasinski; Stephen Merchant; Rick Schwartz; James Sunderland
- Producer: LL Cool J
- Production companies: Eight Million Plus Productions; Nickelodeon Productions

Original release
- Network: Nickelodeon
- Release: December 11, 2016 – February 1, 2019

Lip Sync Battle Shorties is an American reality television program that first aired on Nickelodeon as a special hosted by Sarah Hyland on December 11, 2016, and later returned as a regular television program on October 15, 2017. The program is presented by Nick Cannon and JoJo Siwa.

== Production and broadcast ==
On February 22, 2016, it was announced that Spike and Nickelodeon were developing Lip Sync Battle Jr. with Casey Patterson Entertainment and Matador, as a spinoff of Spike's Lip Sync Battle. On November 17, 2016, it was announced that Sarah Hyland would be hosting, and that an hour-long special would air on Nickelodeon on December 11, 2016, and on Spike on December 14, 2016.

On March 2, 2017, Nickelodeon announced that it had green-lit production on Lip Sync Battle Shorties with a 10-episode order. Production of the program was expected to begin sometime in 2017. On August 1, 2017, it was announced that Nick Cannon would be replacing Sarah Hyland as the host and that JoJo Siwa would be joining him as his sidekick. In the new format, it aired Halloween and holiday specials on Nickelodeon, in October and December 2017, respectively. The program will take its regular slot when new episodes resume on January 12, 2018.

On March 6, 2018, Nickelodeon renewed the program for a second season of 10 episodes.

== Episodes ==
=== Series overview ===
Season	Episodes	Originally released	
Season	Episodes	First released	Last released
Special		December 11, 2016	
1	10	October 15, 2017	March 9, 2018
2	10	October 19, 2018	February 1, 2019

=== Special (2016) ===
Title	Directed by	Written by	Original release date	Prod. code	U.S. viewers (millions)
"Special"	Beth McCarthy-Miller	Jim Wise	December 11, 2016	100	1.78
Songs featured: "Me Too" by Meghan Trainor, "Boss" by Fifth Harmony, "Radioactive" by Imagine Dragons, "Party Rock Anthem" by LMFAO ft. Lauren Bennett and GoonRock, "ABC" by The Jackson 5

=== Season 1 (2017–18) ===
No. overall	No. in season	Title	Original release date	Prod. code	U.S. viewers (millions)
1	1	"Halloween Special"	October 15, 2017	103	1.40
Songs featured: "Bad Romance" by Lady Gaga, "Immortals" by Fall Out Boy, "Rolex" by Ayo & Teo, "Ghostbusters" by Ray Parker Jr. Special guest: Rico Rodriguez
2	2	"Holiday Special"	December 3, 2017	105	1.24
Songs featured: "Drummer Boy" by Justin Bieber ft. Busta Rhymes, "24K Magic" by Bruno Mars, "Underneath the Tree" by Kelly Clarkson, "Worth It" by Fifth Harmony ft. Kid Ink Special guest: Fifth Harmony
3	3	"Dinosaurs; Space; Fierce Goddess"	January 12, 2018	109	1.11
Songs featured: "U Can't Touch This" by MC Hammer, "Something Just Like This" by The Chainsmokers & Coldplay, "Grown Woman" by Beyoncé, "Uma Thurman" by Fall Out Boy Special guest: Pete Wentz
4	4	"Carnival; Fun Fair; Ocean"	January 19, 2018	110	1.08
Songs featured: "Let's Get Loud" by Jennifer Lopez, "That's What I Like" by Bruno Mars, "Timber" by Pitbull ft. Kesha, "Hold On" by Nick Cannon Special guest: Sydney Sierota
5	5	"Music Festival; Outer Space; Medieval Rocker"	January 26, 2018	107	1.03
Songs featured: "HandClap" by Fitz and the Tantrums, "Starships" by Nicki Minaj, "Centuries" by Fall Out Boy, "Can't Hold Us" by Macklemore & Ryan Lewis ft. Ray Dalton Special guest: Breanna Yde
6	6	"Enchanted Forest; Colorful City; Magical Attic"	February 2, 2018	102	0.94
Songs featured: "The Fox (What Does the Fox Say?)" by Ylvis, "Believer" by Imagine Dragons, "Cheap Thrills" by Sia, "Lips Are Movin" by Meghan Trainor Special guest: Daniella Monet
7	7	"Catwalk; Jungle; Girls Night Out"	February 9, 2018	104	0.87
Songs featured: "Instruction" by Demi Lovato & Stefflon Don, "Livin' la Vida Loca" by Ricky Martin, "No" by Meghan Trainor, "Watch Me (Whip/Nae Nae)" by Silentó Special guests: Jack Griffo, Kira Kosarin
8	8	"Disco Gym; Boot Camp; Cupcake Island"	February 23, 2018	101	0.71
Songs featured: "Stronger (What Doesn't Kill You)" by Kelly Clarkson, "Confident" by Demi Lovato, "Cake by the Ocean" by DNCE, "Bills" by LunchMoney Lewis Special guest: Benjamin Flores Jr.
9	9	"Cali Beach; Las Vegas; Alice in Wonderland"	March 2, 2018	106	1.05
Songs featured: "California Gurls" by Katy Perry ft. Snoop Dogg, "A Little Less Conversation" by Elvis Presley vs. JXL, "Stay" by Zedd & Alessia Cara, "Don't Stop the Party" by Pitbull ft. TJR Special guest: Thomas Kuc
10	10	"Twins Special"	March 9, 2018	108	1.00
Songs featured: "I Love It" by Icona Pop, "That's My Girl" by Fifth Harmony, "What Makes You Beautiful" by One Direction, "Hey Ya!" by Outkast Special guest: Laurie Hernandez

=== Season 2 (2018–19) ===
No. overall	No. in season	Title	Original release date	Prod. code	U.S. viewers (millions)
11	1	"Havana Block Party; Mardi Gras Celebration; Basketball Court Get Down"	October 19, 2018	TBA	0.80
Songs featured: "Havana" by Camila Cabello, "Cheerleader" (Felix Jaehn Remix) by Omi, "Swish Swish" by Katy Perry ft. Nicki Minaj
12	2	"African Kingdom; Magical Library; NYE 2999"	October 26, 2018	203	0.90
Songs featured: "Power" by Kanye West, "So What" by Pink, "Sorry" by Justin Bieber
13	3	"British Royal Palace; Western Movie Town; The White House"	November 2, 2018	209	0.91
Songs featured: "Fancy" by Iggy Azalea ft. Charli XCX, "What Lovers Do" by Maroon 5 ft. SZA, "Run the World (Girls)" by Beyoncé
14	4	"Candy Store; Colorful Arcade; 4th of July Party"	November 9, 2018	206	0.76
Songs featured: "Kid in a Candy Store" by JoJo Siwa, "High Top Shoes" by JoJo Siwa, "Boomerang" by JoJo Siwa
15	5	"Zombie Forrest; Cali Music Festival; Deep Space Planet"	November 16, 2018	202	0.81
Songs featured: "My Songs Know What You Did in the Dark (Light Em Up)" by Fall Out Boy, "No Excuses" by Meghan Trainor, "Paradise" (Fedde Le Grand Remix) by Coldplay
16	6	"Stadium Rock Concert; Gotham Style City; '80s Prom"	January 4, 2019	201	0.72
Songs featured: "There's Nothing Holdin' Me Back" by Shawn Mendes, "Humble" by Kendrick Lamar, "The Middle" by Zedd, Grey & Maren Morris
17	7	"Egyptian Tomb; Beauty Parlor; Drive in Movie"	January 11, 2019	210	0.78
Songs featured: "I Gotta Feeling" by The Black Eyed Peas, "Lip Gloss" by Lil Mama, "Dear Future Husband" by Meghan Trainor
18	8	"Hawaiian Luau; Dias de los Muertos Celebration; Superhero Training Camp"	January 18, 2019	TBA	0.71
Songs featured: "Finesse" by Bruno Mars, "Feel It Still" by Portugal. The Man, "Roar" by Katy Perry
19	9	"Broadway Style Weather Spectacular; Super Fun Circus; Cool Skiing Lodge"	January 25, 2019	205	0.86
Songs featured: "Thunder" by Imagine Dragons, "Just like Fire" by Pink, "Ice Ice Baby" by Vanilla Ice
20	10	"Hip Hop Ballroom, Fun Fishing Lake, New York Central Park Egg Hunt"	February 1, 2019	207	0.71
Songs featured: "On the Floor" by Jennifer Lopez, "Shut Up and Fish" by Maddie & Tae, "Treasure" by Bruno Mars

== Ratings ==
Lip Sync Battle Shorties drew more than two million total viewers in Live+7 when it first premiered in December 2016. In addition, content from the special had managed to get over 20 million views on Nickelodeon's YouTube channel.

Viewership and ratings per season of Lip Sync Battle Shorties
Season	Episodes	First aired		Last aired		Avg. viewers (millions)
Season	Episodes	Date	Viewers (millions)	Date	Viewers (millions)	Avg. viewers (millions)
1	10	October 15, 2017	1.40	March 9, 2018	1.00	1.04
2	10	October 19, 2018	0.80	February 1, 2019	0.71	0.80

== See also ==
- Lip Sync Battle
