= Iced Coffee (song) =

2026 song by JoJo Siwa

Single by JoJo Siwa
- Released: November 22, 2024
- Genre: Funk; nu disco
- Label: Columbia
- Songwriters: Alex Schwartz; Joe Khajadourian; Lauren Mandel; Brandon Benjamin; Larzz Principato
- Producers: The Futuristics; Benji Gibson

JoJo Siwa singles chronology
"Guilty Pleasure" (2024)	"Iced Coffee" (2024)	"Bulletproof" (2025)

"Iced Coffee" is a song by American singer JoJo Siwa. It was released by Columbia Records on November 22, 2024, as her final release with the label. it serves as a continuation of her rebranding as an adult pop artist following the release of her EP Guilty Pleasure (2024).

== Background ==
In October 2024, Siwa went viral after jokingly saying, "I also have to say thank you to Beyoncé just so that we can keep the dancing community safe", while accepting an award at the Industry Dance Awards. This referenced a trending internet theory that jokingly suggests thanking Beyoncé prevents bad luck or career fallout. Following the event, Siwa largely stopped posting on social media for approximately one month which led into speculations on TikTok that she had "disappeared" or was "missing" because of the Beyoncé comment.

Siwa first announced the single on November 11, 2024, during an event for the Brown Lecture Board at Brown University. During the lecture, she discussed her transition from a child star on Nickelodeon to a "queer pop" artist, sharing snippets of the song’s first two verses with the audience. Siwa was later seen in Los Angeles in mid-November 2024, photographed by TMZ while carrying a large iced coffee, effectively launching the single's promo. She was also wearing a "Missing Persons" T-shirt that states she was 'last seen' on October 8, 2024, along with a photo of her at the Industry Dance Awards.

== Composition ==
"Iced Coffee" is a funk and nu disco track. It was produced by the duo The Futuristics with co-production by Benji Gibson. The song features slinky funk guitar and a simmering, up-tempo beat. The lyrics explore the theme of homosexuality with playful innuendos, such as in the lines "Like the way you grindin’ my bean" and "We be underneath the sheets, gutting sweet and low". The former line has been criticized as "cringingly on the nose" and technically inaccurate, such as using the term "bean" instead of "seed" for coffee.

It has been compared to Sabrina Carpenter's song "Espresso" and Dua Lipa's song "Levitating".

== Charts ==
Chart performance for "Iced Coffee"
Chart (2024)	Peak position
Lithuania Airplay (TopHit)	70
