= Guilty Pleasure (JoJo Siwa song) =

2024 single by JoJo Siwa

Single by JoJo Siwa

from the EP Guilty Pleasure
- Released: July 12, 2024
- Studio: The Musical Hub, Los Angeles, California
- Genre: Electropop; hyperpop
- Length: 2:35
- Label: Columbia
- Songwriters: Bagel Man; Dino Zisis; Joelle Siwa; Justin Trainor; Meghan Trainor; Nick Monson; Paul Blair
- Producers: DJ White Shadow; Dino Zisis; Nick Monson; Justin Trainor

JoJo Siwa singles chronology
| "Karma" (2024) | "Guilty Pleasure" (2024) | "Iced Coffee" (2024) |

"Guilty Pleasure" is a song by American singer JoJo Siwa for her fourth extended play of the same name. It was released through Columbia Records on July 12, 2024, serving as the second single from the EP. The song was written by Siwa, Meghan Trainor, Paul Blair, Bagel Man with its producers Dino Zisis, Nick Monson and Justin Trainor.

An accompanying music video for "Guilty Pleasure", directed by Siwa and Marc Klasfeld, was released the same day as the single's release. It stars Siwa and various dancers. The video includes scenes with Siwa dressed provocatively acting promiscuous.

== Background and release ==
Siwa announced the EP, her fourth original EP, on June 30, 2024. "Guilty Pleasure" had its debut by Siwa at a recent performance at Trixie Mattel's New York City Pride celebration in Central Park. The reality star was excited to reveal the Guilty Pleasure EP's release date while performing live, even though her audience was not entirely responsive. Its music video debuted along with its release.

== Composition and lyrics ==
According to Her Campus, "Guilty Pleasure" is about Siwa suggesting her lover to make a move on her sexually, although it may also be a way of Siwa's acceptance of her infamous music career. Vulture noted it as "thumping and nonspecific electronic-pop." with a prominent hyperpop sound.

== Critical reception ==
"Guilty Pleasure" received mixed reviews upon release unlike Siwa's previous single "Karma" which was critically panned by fans and critics alike. Vulture praised the song for its upbeatness and catchiness, meanwhile The Cut complimented its nostalgic sound calling it "a relic from 2012."

== Music video ==
Siwa and Klasfeld wrote and directed the music video for "Guilty Pleasure". The music video was released on July 12, 2024, shortly after the single's release and received mainly negative reviews from critics and social media users alike with The Cut calling it "a horny montage of fog machines, pleather, dancing bears, and power tools." The video was choreographed by Richy Jackson whose choreography was also heavily criticized by social media users but was received well by critics. The video features Siwa at a "Guilty Pleasure House" wearing a bra made of teddy bear heads along with rhinestone straps as she gets rowdy with adult-size teddy bears at a burlesque-style peep show. As the video continues she dances in a warehouse dressed as a construction worker in bedazzled attire and finally dressed as a bejeweled dark angel dances in a church with some people wearing dog collars and others dressed as nuns.

== Personnel ==
The following people worked on the song:

- JoJo Siwa – lead vocals, songwriter
- Katie Silverman – songwriter, producer
- Michael Smith – songwriter, producer, mixing engineer
- Bart Schoudel – recording engineer
- Randy Merrill – mastering engineer

== Release history ==
"Guilty Pleasure" release history
| Region | Date | Format | Label | Ref. |
|---|---|---|---|---|
| Various | July 12, 2024 | streaming | Columbia | |
