= Belles =

- Born: Kelli Rachel Jones; June 9, 1999 (age 27); Omaha, Nebraska, U.S.
- Origin: Nashville, Tennessee, U.S.
- Genre: Country
- Occupations: Singer, songwriter
- Instrument: Vocals
- Years active: 2018–present
- Label: Deluge Nashville/East Music Row
- Formerly of: The Belles

Kelli Rachel Jones (born June 9, 1999), professionally known as Belles, is an American country music singer. She began her career in 2018 as one-half of the duo the Belles before recording as a solo artist in the 2020s. In 2026, she made her first appearance on the Billboard Country Airplay charts with "Son of Jolene", a duet with Dolly Parton.

== Biography ==
Kelli Rachel Jones was born June 9, 1999, in Omaha, Nebraska. Her mother, Jaymie, founded the pop group Mulberry Lane in 1999. In 2018, Kelli and Jaymie began recording as a duo called the Belles. This name was inspired by a childhood nickname given to Kelli by her sisters. The Belles recorded an independent, self-titled extended play produced by Mickey Jack Cones. This was followed by the duo serving as an opening act for Dan + Shay, Brett Eldredge, and Old Dominion. They also performed as an opening act for JoJo Siwa during her D.R.E.A.M. The Tour until they were replaced in 2022 by XOMG Pop.

Kelli went solo in 2021, also assuming the name Belles in the process. Throughout the 2020s, she released a number of independent singles produced by Ned Cameron. She signed a record deal with East Music Row Records, a division of Deluge Music, along with a publishing contract from the latter company, in September 2024. Belles announced a 19-concert tour in 2026 titled the Songs & Stories Tour. This was followed in April of that year by the release of her single "Son of Jolene", a duet with Dolly Parton. Written by Belles along with Dan Harrison and Tyler Bank, the song is a sequel to Parton's late 1973-early 1974 hit "Jolene". The song was the last new recording released by Parton during her lifetime. Robert K. Oermann of MusicRow reviewed the song favorably, writing that "[t]he scampering track and Dolly’s pinpoint harmony singing are tingling delights."

On the Billboard Country Airplay chart dated September 12, 2026, "Son of Jolene" debuted at number 51. "Son of Jolene" was included on her debut album, Midwestern, released on October 16, 2026, via East Music Row Records.

== Discography ==
Year	Single	Peak chart positions
Year	Single	US Country Airplay
2026	"Son of Jolene" (with Dolly Parton)	48
