= Brit & Alex =

2002–2009 American pop duo

- Genres: Pop, R&B
- Years active: 2002–2009
- Labels: Hometown Entertainment; Interscope
- Past members: Brit Smith; Alex Smith
- Website: www.britandalex.com

Brit & Alex were an American girl group consisting of identical twin sisters Brit and Alex Smith. After moderate success with the single "Let It Go" (2008), Alex left the group and Brit pursued a solo career as Matisse, after which Brit left the music industry; she later returned in 2024 with "Karma's a Bitch".

== Biography ==
Brit & Alex (born December 3, 1985, in Wilton, Connecticut) became child actors, appearing at age three in the soap opera One Life to Live. They later moved to London, and became known for their appearance as teenagers in advertisements for John Frieda's Sheer Blonde hair products.

Having been singers since childhood, they subsequently moved into music full-time, leaving school at age 18 to pursue careers in music. They were signed by Jimmy Iovine of Hometown/Interscope Records. Their debut single, "Let It Go", appeared in the soundtrack of the 2008 film Step Up 2: The Streets. This single also features the vocal talents of G. Bamford, and was released on April 28, 2008. Their debut album, Brit & Alex, produced by Dallas Austin and Tricky Stewart, had been scheduled for release in 2009.

The popular and critical website Popjustice.com was one of the early supporters of the girls. "Let It Go" got to Number 5 in the UK Commercial Club Chart and Number 1 in the Upfront Club Chart, and was released as a CD single in the UK on 28 April 2008. However, it failed to beat its peak of Number 75 in the UK Singles Chart.

== Breakup ==
It has been confirmed that Brit & Alex are no longer a group. Alex Smith decided to head back to school, leaving twin sister Brit Smith to pursue a solo career. The duo are no longer signed to Interscope Records, but Brit scored a new deal and was signed to Jive Records as "Matisse". Her debut single, "Better Than Her", can be purchased on iTunes.

== Discography ==
=== Singles ===
List of singles, showing year released, chart positions and album name
Title	Year	Peak chart positions		Album
Title	Year	UK	UK Digital	Album
"Let It Go"	2008	75	71	Step Up 2: The Streets (soundtrack)
"Get What I Want"	2010	—	—	Non-album single

=== Other Songs ===
- I Like Boys (B-side to Let It Go)
- Sleepless (B-side to Let It Go)
- I'll Come Running
- Little Girl
- Keep It A Secret
- If You Never Knew
- Are You Ready? [from Sheer Blonde commercial]
- Club Banger
- Too Afraid To Love You
- Lost Highway
- You Don't Even Know
- Fishin'
- BEAutiful
- It Don't Change
