= SNHU Arena =

Arena in New Hampshire, United States

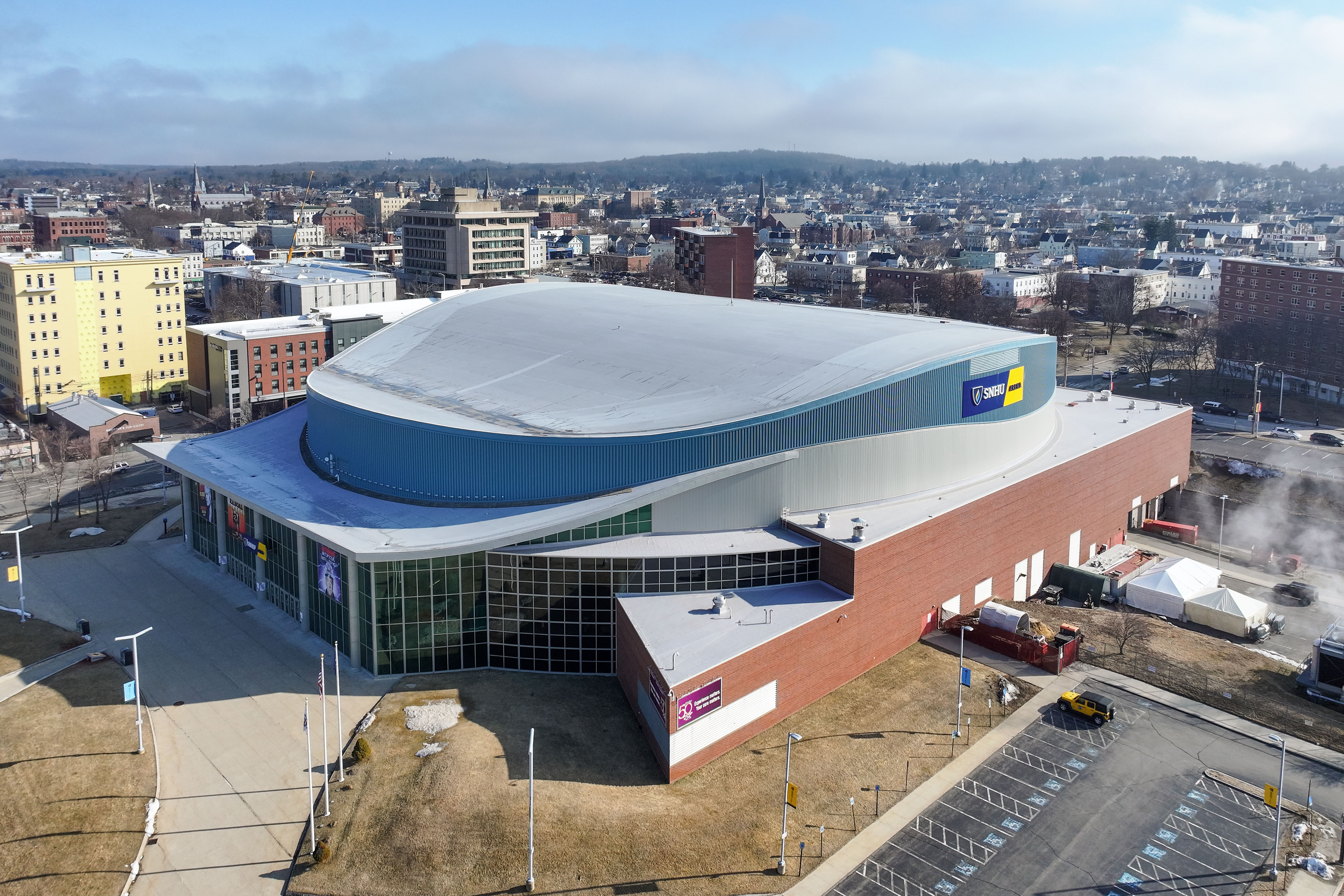
- The arena in 2025
- Interactive map of SNHU Arena
- Full name: Southern New Hampshire University Arena
- Former names: Manchester Civic Arena (planning/construction); Verizon Wireless Arena (2001–16)
- Address: 555 Elm Street
- Location: Manchester, New Hampshire, U.S.
- Coordinates: 42°59′11″N 71°27′44″W
- Owner: City of Manchester
- Operator: ASM Global
- Capacity: 9,852 (hockey); 11,140 (basketball); 10,050 (end stage); 11,770 (center stage concerts)
- Surface: Multi-surface

Construction
- Groundbreaking: April 13, 2000
- Opened: November 15, 2001
- Cost: $68 million ($127 million in 2025 dollars)
- Architects: HOK Sports; Lavallee Brensinger Architects
- Project managers: ScheerGame Sports Development, LLC.
- Structural engineer: LeMessurier Consultants
- General contractor: Gilbane/Harvey

Tenants
- Manchester Monarchs (AHL) (2001–2015); Manchester Wolves (af2) (2004–2009); Manchester Monarchs (ECHL) (2015–2019); New England Liberty (LFL) (2016)

Website
- snhuarena.com

The SNHU Arena (Southern New Hampshire University Arena) is an indoor events arena in Manchester, New Hampshire, and seats 9,852 for ice hockey, 11,140 for basketball and up to 11,770 for concerts.

The facility was originally known during construction as Manchester Civic Center, and this name still appears on most of the directional signs around town. Its naming rights were sold prior to opening in 2001 and was called Verizon Wireless Arena.

On February 2, 2016, Southern New Hampshire University announced that it had purchased the naming rights from the then SMG property management. The specific amount of money involved was never revealed, but it is known that the deal provides for student internships at the arena, and that the school will be able to use the arena for its own sporting and other events. The partnership between SMG and the university will run for a period of at least ten years after the arena officially changed its name on September 1, 2016.

In October 2019, SMG property management company merged with AEG Facilities, creating ASM Global.

The arena contains 542 club seats, 34 luxury suites and five party suites.

== Design ==
The SNHU Arena is located in downtown Manchester on Elm Street (U.S. Route 3) at the corner of Lake Avenue. The arena was built on the site of a former Zayre's department store and is located on an irregular block, surrounded by Elm Street (west), Lake Avenue (north), Chestnut Street (east) and Auburn Street (south), with Cedar (north) and Willow (east) streets taking a corner off the southwestern corner of the block.

The arena's exterior includes its notable curved blue roof, which helps heavy New Hampshire snowfall to slide off. The top half of the arena's facade is a steel oval, the western side of which is lit during events and is visible from the west side of the city and from Interstate 293. The lower half of the building is red brick (similar to that found on Manchester's iconic mills). The main entrance on the western side of the arena is entirely glass.

The floor of the arena is at ground level in the west side of the building. The Manchester Monarchs Pro Shop was formerly located at the entrance. The main concourse is on the second floor, and wraps around the entire arena: the concessions are all on that concourse aside from a bar on the third floor. There are two levels of seating: loge seats around three sides of the arena and a balcony around all four sides. The arena has several luxury boxes, with a second level of boxes on the east and west sides of the interior. The arena has a standard four-sided scoreboard along with several video ribbons, located along the facades of the end zone upper decks. The arena floor level is expandable for larger events by movable seats, and events using an end zone staging area typically use the eastern end zone for the stage.

There are only a handful of onsite parking spaces, all of which are reserved for the handicapped: most patrons park on the street or in one of several large parking lots in downtown Manchester.

== Sporting events ==
=== Minor league ice hockey ===
The arena was home to two iterations of the Manchester Monarchs, one from 2001 to 2015 in the American Hockey League and another from 2015 to 2019 in the ECHL. Both the AHL and ECHL Monarchs franchises were Los Angeles Kings farm teams. After the 2014–2015 season, Manchester and Ontario, California, were two of several markets affected by a "franchise swap" between the ECHL and AHL. The AHL Monarchs franchise moved to Southern California, and the ECHL's Ontario Reign moved to Manchester. The AHL Monarchs and ECHL Reign were both owned by the same company who owned the Kings. A year later, after the 2015–2016 season, the Kings sold the newly relocated ECHL Monarchs to an entity known as PPI Sports LLC. PPI was unable to make the team profitable at the ECHL level, and abruptly closed down the team at the end of the 2019 season after failing to find another buyer. The arena is actively seeking a new tenant.

The AHL Monarchs won the Calder Cup at the end of their last season before moving to Ontario, California.

The arena has hosted the 2005 AHL All-Star Game.

=== Boxing ===
On November 19, 2021, SNHU Arena was the site of Demetrius Andrade vs Jason Quigley, a fight on Matchroom Boxing. This was SNHU Arena's first professional boxing fight.

=== Indoor football ===
From 2004 to 2009, the arena was the home of the Manchester Wolves of the now disbanded AF2, the Arena Football League's minor league.

In 2016, a women's team, the New England Liberty of the Legends Football League, played their home games at the arena, although the Liberty played only one home game during their existence. The Liberty's LFL schedule was only four games long. After losing their first two games on the road, the Liberty lost their first home game 77–7 to the Chicago Bliss, and subsequently opted to forfeit their second and final regular season home game.

=== Basketball ===
The Boston Celtics of the NBA sometimes play preseason games at the arena. The Harlem Globetrotters will occasionally go to the arena.

=== Collegiate ===
The University of New Hampshire men's hockey team occasionally plays some home games at the arena, annually for several years against Dartmouth College in the Battle for the Riverstone Cup, and against the University of Maine Black Bears in the Border War. UNH has not scheduled any games at the arena since the 2015–2016 season, when UNH beat Maine 7–0 on December 30, 2015.

Since 2004, Manchester has been a regular site in the rotation for the Regional tournaments, hosting almost every two years. UNH has been the host institution for the Northeast Regional in 2004, 2007, 2009, 2011, 2013, 2015, 2017, 2019, 2023, and 2025. UNH played regional tournament games in Manchester every one of those years except 2017, 2019, 2023, and 2025 when the Wildcats failed to qualify for the national championship.

Even though the institution's name is on the facility, none of SNHU's athletic programs play any home games at the arena.

=== Professional wrestling ===
The World Wrestling Entertainment has held events at the arena almost every year since 2002, including a pay per view WWE Backlash show in 2005. The most recent WWE event at the arena was on July 9, 2019, when Manchester hosted the weekly WWE Smackdown and WWE 205 series. WWE held a live event on June 4, 2023, with Seth "Freakin" Rollins defending the World Heavyweight Championship vs The Miz. All Elite Wrestling, the biggest competitor to WWE, ran an episode of Dynamite, their flagship show, at the venue, opposite An ECW-Style event for WWE's NXT brand the day after the 2024 Election on November 6, 2024.

=== Other ===
State high school basketball and hockey championships have been held in the arena.

The Professional Bull Riders Unleashed the Beast tour has made a few stops at the arena since 2020, when Jess Lockwood won the inaugural event in January 2020.

== Concerts ==
SNHU Arena is one of New Hampshire's biggest concert venues, after Bank of New Hampshire Pavilion. SNHU Arena has hosted many concerts by major performers, many of whom have visited the Manchester venue on multiple occasions. Both Trans-Siberian Orchestra, and Boston Pops Orchestra have performed several times at SNHU Arena, with both groups frequently visiting in December to put on holiday-oriented performances.

== Other events ==
Hillary Clinton appeared at the arena in June 2007, to speak at the Manchester Central High School graduation.

In December 2007, then-Senator Barack Obama (D-IL) and TV icon Oprah Winfrey appeared at a campaign rally at the arena, drawing over 8,000 people. Obama also appeared at the arena in May 2007 to speak at the Southern New Hampshire University commencement.

Adam Sandler, a Manchester native, has given three graduation speeches at the arena: in both 2003 and 2010 he addressed the graduates of his alma mater Manchester Central High School, and he also spoke at the 2008 Manchester Memorial High School graduation.

2012 Republican presidential nominee Gov. Mitt Romney delivered his final speech before election day at the arena on November 5, 2012. The event drew nearly 18,000 people and was the largest political event in New Hampshire's history. Overflow supporters were forced to watch the speech on large outdoor televisions because the arena ran out of space. The event included a concert performed by Kid Rock in support of Gov. Romney.

The night before the 2016 New Hampshire Presidential Primary, on February 8, 2016, presidential candidate Donald Trump closed out his New Hampshire campaign with an evening rally at the Verizon Wireless Arena. The night before the general election, on November 7, 2016, Republican presidential nominee Trump returned to the newly renamed SNHU Arena to address a raucous overflow crowd, beginning his speech by saying "there are thousands of people outside trying to get in." Trump rallies for the 2020 election were held at the arena on August 15, 2019, and on February 10, 2020. Both drew large crowds.

The New Hampshire Democratic Party held its annual convention at the arena in the 2015 and plans to do so again in September 2019.

The FIRST Robotics Competition holds its regional competition, the BAE Systems Granite State Regional, in the arena every year.

JoJo Siwa's D.R.E.A.M. tour made a stop at SNHU Arena on February 22, 2022.

On September 21 and 22, 2024, the arena became a secondary location for the Granite State Comicon, also known as Granitecon. Amongst various vendors and artists, it played host to several actors involved in the Teenage Mutant Ninja Turtles franchise for its 40th anniversary. The arena has continued to serve as a venue for the convention alongside its primary venue at the nearby DoubleTree hotel in subsequent years.

== Photo gallery ==
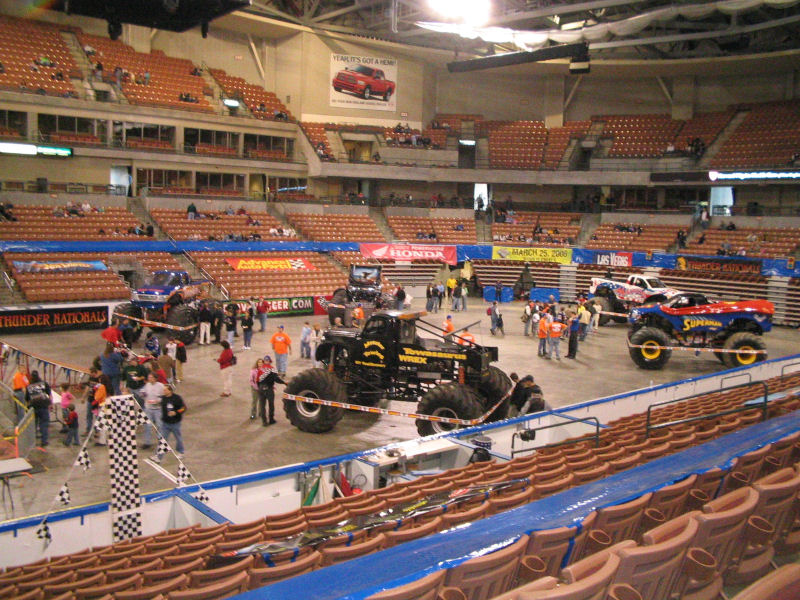
USHRA Thunder Nationals pre-show "pit party" in the arena

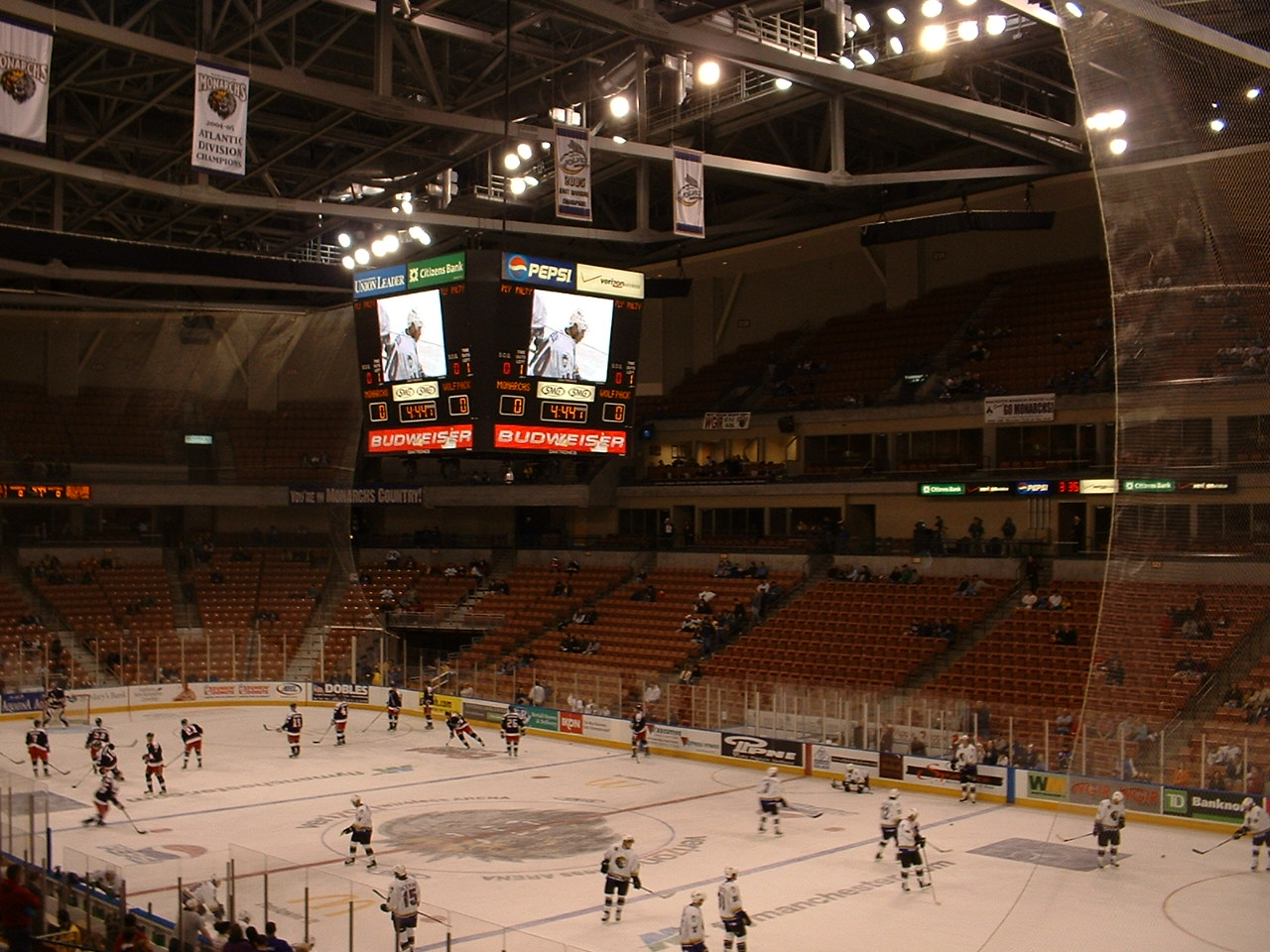
Pregame warmup at a Manchester Monarchs AHL game versus the Hartford Wolf Pack

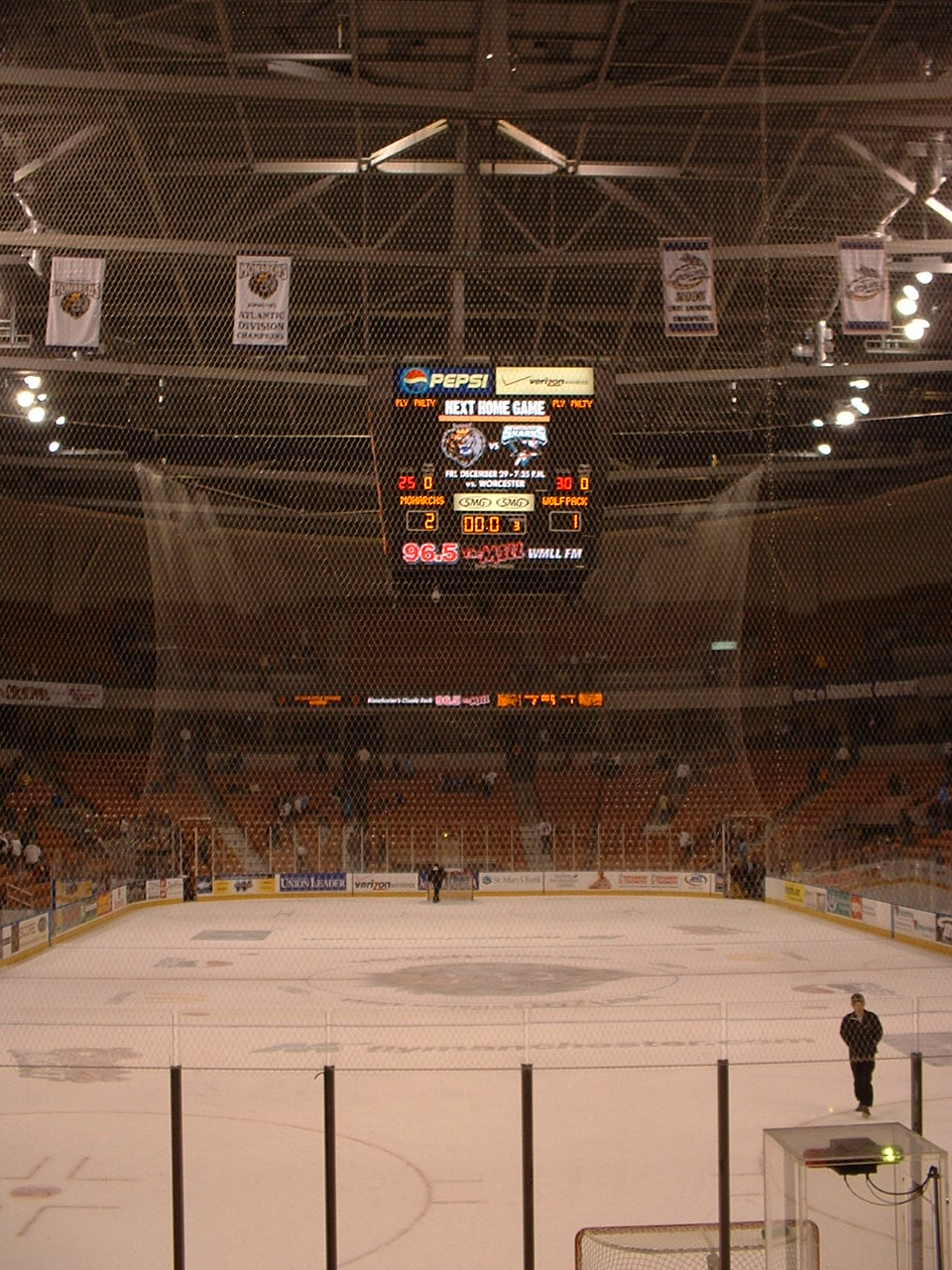
End zone view of the ice surface at the arena

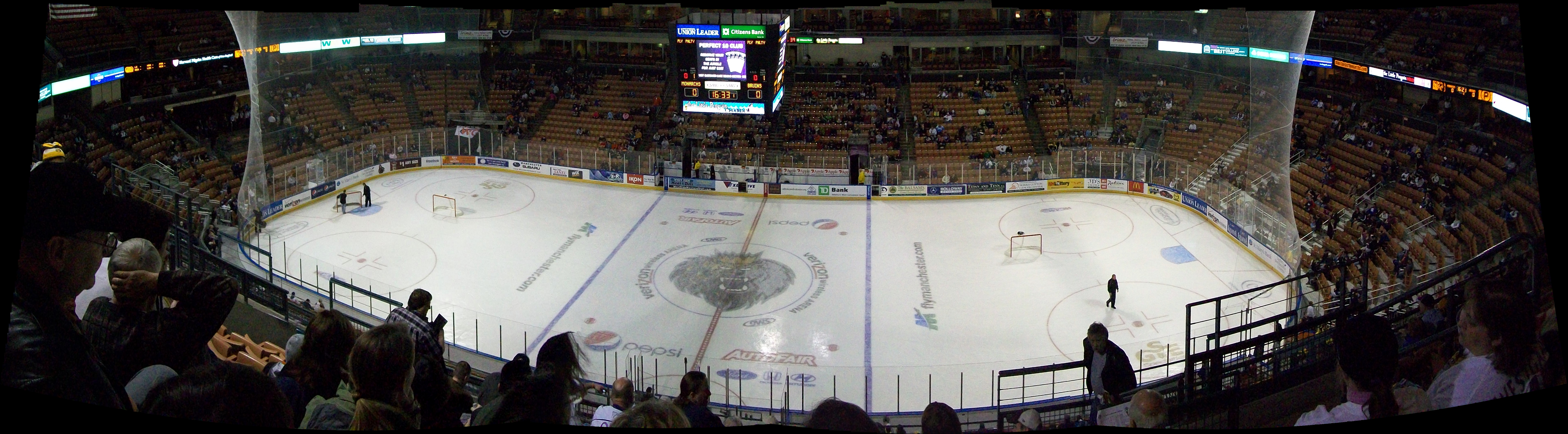
A stitched panoramic image of the inside of the arena before a Manchester Monarchs AHL game versus the Providence Bruins
