= Karma (JoJo Siwa song) =

2024 single by JoJo Siwa

Single by JoJo Siwa

from the EP Guilty Pleasure
- Released: April 5, 2024
- Genre: Dance-pop; EDM
- Length: 3:07
- Label: Columbia
- Songwriters: Antonina Armato; Desmond Child; Tim James
- Producers: Rock Mafia; DJ White Shadow

JoJo Siwa singles chronology
"Nonstop" (2020)	"Karma" (2024)	"Guilty Pleasure" (2024)

Music video
- "Karma" on YouTube

"Karma" is a song by American singer and media personality JoJo Siwa for her fourth extended play, Guilty Pleasure (2024). It was released through Columbia Records on April 5, 2024, as the lead single from the EP. It is a dance-pop and EDM song about cheating on a significant other without thinking of the consequences. Produced by Rock Mafia and DJ White Shadow, it serves as a rebrand, marking her departure from her previous child-friendly image.

The song was panned by music critics, marked by heavy online ridicule and over 3 million YouTube dislikes, and simultaneously went viral. Critics largely slammed the song's "edgy" rebrand, calling it a failed imitation. Commercially, it peaked at number 5 on Billboard's Hot Dance/Electronic Songs chart and number 22 on the Bubbling Under Hot 100. Before its release, it peaked at number 37 on the TikTok Billboard Top 50 charts. Siwa's rebrand with "Karma" has been parodied on Saturday Night Live (SNL) by cast member and American actress Chloe Fineman in a May 4, 2024 episode.

== Background and composition ==
In March 2024, Siwa began posting cryptic teasers on her social media accounts, starting with a viewer discretion warning for a then-upcoming release, stating that it was "not made for children" and "may be disturbing or offensive to some viewers". On March 18, she announced and revealed the title of the song. "Karma" was originally recorded in 2012 by Brit Smith as "Karma's a Bitch", but never released. Following the release of Siwa's version, Smith's song was released as a single after gaining traction online.

Musically, the song is an upbeat dance-pop and EDM track. The lyrics speak of a woman's regret of being caught being unfaithful to a romantic partner, seeing it as karma when they move on from her to someone new.

== Reception ==
"Karma" was panned by music critics, criticizing the song and Siwa's reinvention of her brand and aesthetic. Ivan Guzman, writing for Paper, called the song "raucous" and "early 2010s-esque", while drag queen Aquaria compared the song to "early-2010s Jeffree Star". For Exclaim!, Sydney Brasil labelled the song as "poorly produced" with "no real hook" and wrote that Siwa did not seem fully committed to her "new ['bad girl'] persona". Jason P. Frank of Vulture wrote that "Karma" had "a thumping, uninspired beat" and "faux-edgy lyrics [...] performed with all the conviction of the elementary-age students who used to be her fans". Variety included "Karma" in their Worst Songs of 2024 list, with Steven J. Horowitz describing it as "tepid, 2011-sounding" and Siwa as "unconvincing in her good-girl-gone-bad overhaul, with a hook and aesthetic that evoke the lifeless thump of a Chuck E. Cheese jingle."

Harsh social media criticism of the song "Karma" has been attributed to the online disinhibition effect by Katie Camero, writing for USA Today.

== Plagiarism allegation ==
Following the release of Siwa's song on April 5, the music video for Brit Smith's "Karma's a Bitch", uploaded to Vimeo in 2013, went viral on social media. It gained enough media attention to prompt Smith to release the song as a single. When asked about Brit Smith's version after receiving criticism online over "stealing" the song, Siwa stated that she "didn't steal anything" as "people write songs and [....] don't do anything with them", making sense for another artist "a few years later". She also said that she "[doesn't] know who Brit Smith is". Smith expressed her amazement at her version going viral, stating she was shocked that her song has now "got a new life, which is amazing". Smith later defended Siwa on her TikTok account, stating that Siwa "did not steal" the song, and "was totally in the right" in regards to recording her version, adding that Siwa had "done nothing wrong".

== Music video ==
The music video for "Karma", filmed in March 2024, was directed by Siwa and Marc Klasfeld, with choreography by Richy Jackson. Siwa pitched the concept and choreography for the music video a year before its release. It stars Alexis Warr, the winner of So You Think You Can Dance's 17th season, on which Siwa was a judge. The music video contains lesbian themes throughout, and the video depicts a love triangle between Siwa and two other women (one portrayed by Warr). JoJo wore a two-part white outfit with boots during the yacht scenes, an unspecifed outfit while barefoot during the underwater scenes, and an outfit that has been compared to those of Kiss during the deserted island scenes with Warr also in similar outfits. Upon returning to the yacht in reverse, JoJo sticks with a relationship with Warr's character. Hannah Dailey of Billboard called the video "truly wild" and wrote that it "marks an extreme departure from [her] kid-friendly persona".

As of May 30, 2024, the video has amassed over 40 million views on YouTube. On July 18, Siwa uploaded a video about the most disliked music video as of 2024, with her music video ranking as first with 3.1 million dislikes.

== Charts ==
Chart performance for "Karma"
Chart (2024)	Peak position
Canada (Canadian Hot 100)	100
Ireland (IRMA)	93
New Zealand Hot Singles (RMNZ)	24
UK Singles (Official Charts)	76
US Bubbling Under Hot 100 (Billboard)	22
US Hot Dance/Electronic Songs (Billboard)	5
