= Emeline (singer) =

American singer-songwriter (born 1998)

- Emeline in 2022

Background information
- Also known as: Emeline Easton
- Born: Emeline Easton Herreid; March 9, 1998 (age 28); Providence, Rhode Island
- Origin: Los Angeles, California
- Genres: Pop; Alt pop
- Occupations: Singer; songwriter; actress
- Instrument: Vocals
- Years active: 2013-present
- Labels: Capitol; EMELINE
- Website: Emeline Music

Emeline Easton Herreid (born March 9, 1998), known professionally as Emeline or Emeline Easton, is an American singer-songwriter based in Los Angeles, but got her start in her home state of Rhode Island. She began releasing singles as part of her solo career in 2020. One of the songs Emeline wrote, "Choose UR Fighter" was sold by her record label and ended up being recorded by JoJo Siwa. Emeline released her debut EP The Devil On My Bra Strap in 2025, followed by her debut album Emotional Virgin in 2026.

== Early life ==
Emeline Easton Herreid was born on March 9, 1998, in Providence, Rhode Island. She began singing and acting when she was 9 years old and was featured in an all children's version on the Broadway show Annie. Emeline attended The Met High School. She performed in many local theaters in Rhode Island including Trinity Rep. Between 2013 and 2016, Emeline released original songs as Emeline Easton, including a single called "You" which charted in the top 100 for singers under 16. When she was 17, Emeline moved to Los Angeles to further her career.

== Career ==
=== 2020 - 2024: Career beginnings ===
In 2020, Emeline released her debut single titled "6 Foot Deep." In April 2021 Emeline released her next single "Animal" and in June she released "Flowers and Sex". In August Emeline released a two song single including "What It Means To Be A Girl" and "This is How I Learn To Say No". The next three years saw more standalone singles from Emeline. In April 2022 she released " Cinderella's Dead" followed by "Strut!" in August and "Venting to Strangers" in November. In March 2023 Emeline released "Feelings". In June 2023 Emeline released "Everything I'm Not." In October 2023 Emeline released "Make Out With a Stranger." In March 2024 Emeline released "Iconique". In April she released "99 Boys". In June Emeline released "Grown Man Cry". This was her last single under Capitol Records.

=== 2025 - present: The Devil On My Bra Strap and Emotional Virgin ===
After ending her original record deal, Emeline made her music under her self titled record label starting in 2025. In February 2025 Emeline released "Choose UR Fighter (Emeline's Version)". The song "Choose UR Fighter" was originally written by Emeline back in 2022, but Emeline's record label sold the right to the song, without Emeline's knowledge. This led to the song being picked up and recorded by being recorded by former Dance Moms dancer, JoJo Siwa, who released as a part of an EP in the summer of 2024. Emeline rerecorded the song to reclaim ownership of her work.

Emeline performing during her Emotional Virgin Tour

In May 2025, Emeline released her debut EP, The Devil On My Bra Strap. After the release of the EP, Emeline began to release singles for her upcoming album. In October she released the single "Emotional Virgin", also the title of her upcoming album. Emeline describes this song as the first love song, she's released as it dedicated to her late girlfriend. The final single she released leading up to the album release was "Dance With My Demons". In February 2026 Emeline released "Dancing With My Demons" In which the music video was directed by Emeline herself. In March 2026 Emeline released her debut album Emotional Virgin, accompanying her release, she went on her first headlining tour which started on Valentines Day, though the rest of the tour continued in April.

== Artistry ==
Emeline's music often reflects on her own personal struggles, especially her struggles in the music industry, as well as the systemic challenges women face. On her song "Iconique," Emeline worked with Charli XCX collaborator, Mike Wise. Emeline received a co-sign from Elton John, a moment that Emeline said really encouraged her. Emeline cites ABBA, Madonna and Carly Rae Jepsen as influences.

== Discography ==
Albums and EPs
Name	Type	Year
The Devil On My Bra Strap	EP	2025
Emotional Virgin	Album	2026

Singles
Name	Year
6 Foot Deep	2020
Animal	2021
Flowers & Sex	2021
This Is How I Learn To Say No	2021
What It Means To Be a Girl	2021
Cinderella's Dead	2022
Strut	2022
Venting To Strangers	2022
Feelings	2023
Everything I'm Not	2023
Makeout With a Stranger	2023
Iconique	2024
99 Boys	2024
Grown Man Cry	2024
Choose UR Fighter (Emeline's Version)	2025
