= D.R.E.A.M. The Tour =

2019–22 concert tour by JoJo Siwa

JoJo Siwa D.R.E.A.M. The Tour
- Tour by JoJo Siwa
- Location: North America; Europe; Oceania
- Associated album: D.R.E.A.M. The Music; Celebrate
- Start date: May 17, 2019
- End date: March 12, 2022
- Legs: 4
- No. of shows: 132
- Supporting acts: Belles (2019-2020), XOMG POP (2022)

JoJo Siwa concert chronology
- D.R.E.A.M. The Tour (2019–2022); Infinity Heart Tour (2025)

JoJo Siwa D.R.E.A.M. The Tour or D.R.E.A.M. The Tour was the debut concert tour by American singer and dancer JoJo Siwa. It was supported by AEG Presents which ran from 17 May 2019 to 12 March 2022 (1031 days).

Meant to support Siwa's first two EPs; D.R.E.A.M. The Music (2018) and Celebrate (2019), the tour was initially announced in November 2018 with North American dates being released at the same time, with Australian and U.K. dates announced afterwards. Girl pop group XOMG POP (which had debuted on Siwas Dance Pop Revolution) appeared as support acts on later dates during the tour. Prior to that, country music duo Belles had appeared as the supporting act during the tour.

== Background ==
On November 7, 2018, Siwa first announced a 26-show tour performing in theaters in North America. On December 11, 2018, Siwa extended the North American leg, adding 28 shows performing in outdoor amphitheatres and arenas. On April 4, 2019, 17 dates were added. On June 10, 2019, 11 more dates were added, marking the total number of shows to 82 in the first leg. On June 18, 2019, dates were announced for Europe in the United Kingdom and Ireland. On September 10, 2019, Siwa announced that the tour will stop in Oceania. On November 18, 2019, she added 50 shows touring North America a second time.

== Set list ==
2019-2020

This setlist is representative of the show on 11 January 2020 in Brisbane. It is unrepresentative for all concerts for the duration of the tour throughout 2019 and 2020.

1. "Worldwide Party"
2. "It's Time to Celebrate"
3. "My Story"
4. "Hold the Drama"
5. "Every Girl's a Super Girl"
6. "I Want Candy" / "Tootsie Roll"
7. "Kid in a Candy Store"
8. "Everyday Popstars"
9. "Take Me Out to the Ball Game"
10. "High Top Shoes"
11. "We Will Rock You" / "Another One Bites the Dust" / "We Are the Champions"
12. "Only Getting Better"
13. "#1U"
14. "Crocodile Rock"
15. 'Bop!"
16. "D.R.E.A.M."

Encore

1. "Boomerang"
2022
1. "Worldwide Party"
2. "It's Time to Celebrate"
3. "Dance Through the Day"
4. "Hold the Drama"
5. "Every Girl's a Super Girl"
6. "I Want Candy" / "Tootsie Roll"
7. "Kid in a Candy Store"
8. "Everyday Popstars"
9. "Take Me Out to the Ball Game"
10. "High Top Shoes"
11. "Outta the Park"
12. "We Will Rock You" / "Another One Bites the Dust" / "We Are the Champions"
13. "Only Getting Better"
14. "#1U"
15. "U-N-I"
16. 'Bop!"
17. "Back to that Girl"
18. "Nobody Can Change Me!"
19. "D.R.E.A.M."

Encore

1. "Boomerang"

== Tour dates ==
North America
Date	City	Country	Venue
May 17, 2019	Phoenix	United States	Comerica Theatre
May 19, 2019	Los Angeles	United States	Microsoft Theater
May 20, 2019	San Diego	United States	San Diego Civic Theatre
May 21, 2019	San Jose	United States	City National Civic
May 23, 2019	Seattle	United States	McCaw Hall
May 25, 2019	Eugene	United States	Silva Concert Hall
May 28, 2019	Salt Lake City	United States	Abravanel Hall
May 30, 2019	Denver	United States	Paramount Theatre
June 1, 2019	Tulsa	United States	Brady Theater
June 2, 2019	Kansas City	United States	Midland Theatre
June 4, 2019	St. Louis	United States	Stifel Theatre
June 5, 2019	Des Moines	United States	Des Moines Civic Center
June 6, 2019	Minneapolis	United States	Northrop Auditorium
June 8, 2019 (Note: The concerts on June 8 and 9 were part of Nickelodeon Slimefest 2019.)	Chicago	United States	Huntington Bank Pavilion
June 9, 2019	Chicago	United States	Huntington Bank Pavilion
June 11, 2019	Cleveland	United States	KeyBank State Theatre
June 12, 2019	Baltimore	United States	Modell Performing Arts Center
June 13, 2019	New Brunswick	United States	State Theatre New Jersey
June 15, 2019	Hartford	United States	Mortensen Hall
June 16, 2019	Lowell	United States	Lowell Memorial Auditorium
June 18, 2019	New York City	United States	Beacon Theatre
June 20, 2019	Charlotte	United States	Ovens Auditorium
June 21, 2019	Nashville	United States	Andrew Jackson Hall
June 22, 2019	Atlanta	United States	John A. Williams Theatre
June 25, 2019	Grand Prairie	United States	The Theatre at Grand Prairie
June 26, 2019	Austin	United States	Bass Concert Hall
July 10, 2019	Orlando	United States	Amway Center
July 12, 2019	Sunrise	United States	BB&T Center
July 13, 2019	St. Augustine	United States	St. Augustine Amphitheatre
July 14, 2019	Charleston	United States	Volvo Cars Stadium
July 16, 2019	Greensboro	United States	Greensboro Coliseum
July 18, 2019	Richmond	United States	Virginia Credit Union Live!
July 19, 2019	Wolf Trap	United States	Filene Center at Wolf Trap
July 20, 2019	Ledyard	United States	Grand Theater at Foxwoods
July 21, 2019	Queens	United States	Forest Hills Stadium
July 23, 2019	Boston	United States	Agganis Arena
July 24, 2019	Newark	United States	Prudential Center
July 26, 2019	Uniondale	United States	Nassau Veterans Memorial Coliseum
July 27, 2019	Philadelphia	United States	TD Pavilion at the Mann
July 28, 2019	Lewistown	United States	Artpark Amphitheater
July 30, 2019	Pittsburgh	United States	Petersen Events Center
July 31, 2019	Columbus	United States	Schottenstein Center
August 2, 2019	Toronto	Canada	Ricoh Coliseum
August 3, 2019	Detroit	United States	Detroit Masonic Temple
August 4, 2019	Milwaukee	United States	BMO Harris Pavilion
August 6, 2019	Omaha	United States	Baxter Arena
August 8, 2019	Broomfield	United States	1stBank Center
August 10, 2019	Las Vegas	United States	Mandalay Bay Events Center
August 11, 2019	Santa Barbara	United States	Santa Barbara Bowl
August 13, 2019	Anaheim	United States	Honda Center
August 14, 2019	Oakland	United States	Oakland Arena
August 15, 2019	Reno	United States	Reno Events Center
August 17, 2019	Portland	United States	Theater of the Clouds
August 18, 2019	Redmond	United States	Marymoor Park
August 20, 2019	Vancouver	Canada	Thunderbird Sports Centre
August 24, 2019	Lincoln	United States	Pinnacle Bank Arena
August 25, 2019	Cedar Rapids	United States	U.S. Cellular Center
August 27, 2019	Grand Rapids	United States	Van Andel Arena
August 28, 2019	Kettering	United States	Fraze Pavilion
August 29, 2019	Rosemont	United States	Rosemont Theatre
August 31, 2019	Wilkes-Barre	United States	Mohegan Sun Arena at Casey Plaza
September 1, 2019	Harrington	United States	M&T Bank Grandstand
September 4, 2019	Toledo	United States	Huntington Center
September 6, 2019	Indianapolis	United States	Bankers Life Fieldhouse
September 7, 2019	Louisville	United States	KFC Yum! Center
September 8, 2019	Birmingham	United States	Legacy Arena
September 10, 2019	Memphis	United States	FedExForum
September 11, 2019	New Orleans	United States	Lakefront Arena
September 13, 2019	Sugar Land	United States	Smart Financial Centre
September 14, 2019	San Antonio	United States	AT&T Center
September 15, 2019	Edinburg	United States	Bert Ogden Arena
September 17, 2019	Grand Prairie	United States	The Theatre at Grand Prairie
September 18, 2019	Cedar Park	United States	H-E-B Center at Cedar Park
September 20, 2019	Tulsa	United States	BOK Center
September 21, 2019	Kansas City	United States	Sprint Center
September 22, 2019	St. Louis	United States	Chaifetz Arena
September 24, 2019	Nashville	United States	Bridgestone Arena
September 26, 2019	Duluth	United States	Infinite Energy Arena
September 27, 2019	Greenville	United States	Bon Secours Wellness Arena
September 29, 2019	Charlottesville	United States	John Paul Jones Arena
October 1, 2019	Bridgeport	United States	Webster Bank Arena
October 2, 2019	Providence	United States	Dunkin' Donuts Center
Europe
October 30, 2019	Glasgow	Scotland	OVO Hydro
October 31, 2019	Manchester	England	AO Arena
November 2, 2019	Birmingham	England	LG Arena
November 3, 2019	London	England	The O_{2} Arena
November 4, 2019	Cardiff	Wales	Motorpoint Arena Cardiff
November 6, 2019	Dublin	Ireland	3Arena
November 7, 2019	Dublin	Ireland	3Arena
Australia
January 10, 2020	Brisbane	Australia	Brisbane Entertainment Centre
January 11, 2020	Brisbane	Australia	Brisbane Entertainment Centre
January 13, 2020	Sydney	Australia	Aware Super Theatre
January 14, 2020	Sydney	Australia	Aware Super Theatre
January 16, 2020	Melbourne	Australia	Plenary Hall
January 17, 2020	Melbourne	Australia	Plenary Hall
January 18, 2020	Melbourne	Australia	Plenary Hall
North America (Note: Shows in 2022 were originally scheduled for 2020, and then 2021, but were eventually rescheduled due to the COVID-19 pandemic.)
March 11, 2020	Colorado Springs	United States	Broadmoor World Arena
January 13, 2022	Spokane	United States	Spokane Arena
January 15, 2022	Boise	United States	ExtraMile Arena
January 16, 2022	Salt Lake City	United States	Vivint Arena
January 18, 2022	Sacramento	United States	Golden 1 Center
January 20, 2022	Fresno	United States	Save Mart Center
January 21, 2022	Bakersfield	United States	Mechanics Bank Arena
January 23, 2022	Glendale	United States	Gila River Arena
January 26, 2022	Las Cruces	United States	Pan American Center
January 27, 2022	Lubbock	United States	United Supermarkets Arena
January 29, 2022 (Note: Part of XOMG Pop Performing.)	Houston	United States	Toyota Center
January 31, 2022	North Little Rock	United States	Simmons Bank Arena
February 1, 2022	Oklahoma City	United States	Paycom Center
February 4, 2022	Moline	United States	TaxSlayer Center
February 6, 2022	Grand Forks	United States	Ralph Engelstad Arena
February 7, 2022	Minneapolis	United States	Target Center
February 8, 2022	Green Bay	United States	Resch Center
February 10, 2022	Rosemont	United States	Allstate Arena
February 11, 2022	Evansville	United States	Ford Center
February 14, 2022	Lexington	United States	Rupp Arena at Central Bank Center
February 15, 2022	Fort Wayne	United States	Allen County War Memorial Coliseum
February 17, 2022	Springfield	United States	JQH Arena
February 20, 2022	Syracuse	United States	Upstate Medical University Arena
February 21, 2022	Portland	United States	Cross Insurance Arena
February 22, 2022	Manchester	United States	SNHU Arena
February 25, 2022	Trenton	United States	CURE Insurance Arena
February 26, 2022	Hershey	United States	Giant Center
February 27, 2022	Cleveland	United States	Rocket Mortgage FieldHouse
March 1, 2022	Raleigh	United States	PNC Arena
March 3, 2022	Charlotte	United States	Time Warner Cable Arena
March 5, 2022	Columbia	United States	Colonial Life Arena
March 6, 2022	Tampa	United States	Amalie Arena
March 8, 2022	Jacksonville	United States	VyStar Veterans Memorial Arena
March 10, 2022	Pensacola	United States	Pensacola Bay Center
March 11, 2022	Bossier City	United States	Brookshire Grocery Arena
March 12, 2022	New Orleans	United States	Smoothie King Center

== Cancelled dates ==
List of box office score data with venue, city, attendance, and gross revenue
Date	City	Country	Venue	Reason
March 21, 2020 (Note: The concerts on March 21 and 22, 2020 were part of Nickelodeon Slimefest 2020.)	Inglewood	United States	The Forum	COVID-19 pandemic
March 22, 2020	Inglewood	United States	The Forum	COVID-19 pandemic
April 21, 2020	Madison	United States	Kohl Center	COVID-19 pandemic
May 16, 2020	Norfolk	United States	Chartway Arena	COVID-19 pandemic
May 23, 2020	Miami	United States	FTX Arena	COVID-19 pandemic
May 27, 2020	Estero	United States	Hertz Arena	COVID-19 pandemic
June 19, 2020 (Note: This concert was originally scheduled to take place on March 31, 2020, then on June 19, 2020, but was cancelled due to the coronavirus pandemic.)	Yakima	United States	Yakima Valley SunDome	COVID-19 pandemic
June 30, 2021 (Note: This concert was originally scheduled to take place on April 3, 2020, then on June 30, 2021, but was cancelled due to the coronavirus pandemic.)	Edmonton	Canada	Rogers Place	COVID-19 pandemic
July 2, 2021 (Note: This concert was originally scheduled to take place on April 5, 2020, then on July 2, 2021, but was cancelled due to the coronavirus pandemic.)	Calgary	Canada	Scotiabank Saddledome	COVID-19 pandemic
July 3, 2021 (Note: This concert was originally scheduled to take place on April 6, 2020, then on July 3, 2021, but was cancelled due to the coronavirus pandemic.)	Saskatoon	Canada	SaskTel Centre	COVID-19 pandemic
July 5, 2021 (Note: This concert was originally scheduled to take place on April 8, 2020, then on July 5, 2021, but was cancelled due to the coronavirus pandemic.)	Winnipeg	Canada	Canada Life Centre	COVID-19 pandemic
July 11, 2021 (Note: This concert was originally scheduled to take place on April 19, 2020, then on July 11, 2021, but was cancelled due to the coronavirus pandemic.)	Champaign	United States	State Farm Center	COVID-19 pandemic
July 30, 2021 (Note: This concert was originally scheduled to take place on May 12, 2020, then on July 30, 2021, but was cancelled due to the coronavirus pandemic.)	New York City	United States	Madison Square Garden	COVID-19 pandemic
July 31, 2021 (Note: This concert was originally scheduled to take place on May 8, 2020, then on July 31, 2021, but was cancelled due to the coronavirus pandemic.)	Washington, D.C.	United States	Capital One Arena	COVID-19 pandemic
February 17, 2022 (Note: This concert was originally scheduled to take place on April 30, 2020, then on July 21, 2021, but was rescheduled due to the coronavirus pandemic. However, it was rescheduled to February 17, 2022 but was postponed again due to border conflicts.)	Hamilton	Canada	FirstOntario Centre	COVID-19 pandemic
February 18, 2022 (Note: This concert was originally scheduled to take place on May 1, 2020, then on July 22, 2021, but was rescheduled due to the coronavirus pandemic. However, it was rescheduled to February 18, 2022 but was postponed again due to border conflicts.)	Ottawa	Canada	Canadian Tire Centre	COVID-19 pandemic

== Box office score data ==
List of box office score data with venue, city, attendance, and gross revenue
Venue	City	Tickets sold / available	Gross revenue
Resorts World Arena	Birmingham	7,704 / 8,454 (91%)	$402,489
The O2 Arena	London	11,229 / 11,633 (97%)	$610,105
3Arena	Dublin	15,884 / 16,653 (95%)	$1,117,657
Brisbane Entertainment Centre	Brisbane	11,897 / 12,845 (93%)	$472,045
First State Super Theatre	Sydney	11,665 / 11,665 (100%)	$533,736
Plenary Hall	Melbourne	12,938 / 13,126 (99%)	$646,124
TOTAL		71,317 / 73,972 (96%)	$3,782,156
