= List of Paramount+ original films =

This article lists all films, documentary films and specials produced for release on Paramount+, formerly known as CBS All Access, an American over-the-top subscription video on demand service owned and operated by Paramount Streaming, a division of Paramount Skydance.

== Original films ==
=== Feature films ===
Title	Genre	Release date	Runtime	Language
The SpongeBob Movie: Sponge on the Run	Animated comedy	March 4, 2021 (Note: Alongside a PVOD release; United States only)	1 h 31 min	English
Infinite (Note: Unavailable)	Science fiction action thriller	June 10, 2021 (Note: United States); August 11, 2021 (Note: Canada, Latin America, the Nordics and Australia)	1 h 46 min	English
The J Team	Musical	September 3, 2021	1 h 25 min	English
Paranormal Activity: Next of Kin	Supernatural horror	October 29, 2021	1 h 38 min	English
Rumble	Animated comedy	December 15, 2021	1 h 35 min	English
The In Between	Supernatural romance	February 11, 2022	1 h 56 min	English
Three Months	Comedy drama	February 23, 2022	1 h 44 min	English
Jerry & Marge Go Large	Comedy	June 17, 2022	1 h 36 min	English
Beavis and Butt-Head Do the Universe	Adult animated comedy	June 23, 2022	1 h 26 min	English
Honor Society	Coming-of-age comedy	July 29, 2022	1 h 38 min	English
Secret Headquarters	Superhero/Family action comedy	August 12, 2022 (Note: United States and Canada)	1 h 44 min	English
Orphan: First Kill	Psychological horror	August 19, 2022 (Note: Alongside both video on demand and limited theatrical release; United States only)	1 h 39 min	English
6 Festivals	Drama	August 25, 2022 (Note: Exclusive to Australia)	1 h 30 min	English
Quattordici giorni	Romantic drama	September 16, 2022	1 h 40 min	Italian
On the Come Up	Drama	September 23, 2022 (Note: Alongside a limited theatrical release; United States only)	1 h 56 min	English
Significant Other	Science fiction horror	October 7, 2022	1 h 24 min	English
El gerente	Comedy	October 20, 2022	1 h 45 min	Spanish
Blue's Big City Adventure	Educational children's comedy	November 18, 2022	1 h 14 min	English
Fantasy Football	Sports comedy	November 25, 2022	1 h 38 min	English
Corazonada	Drama	December 16, 2022	1 h 30 min	Spanish
Snow Day	Coming-of-age musical comedy	December 16, 2022 (Note: Also premiered on Nickelodeon)	1 h 18 min	English
Burning Hearts	Crime drama	January 6, 2023	1 h 55 min	Italian
Teen Wolf: The Movie	Supernatural teen drama	January 26, 2023	2 h, 20 min	English
At Midnight	Romantic comedy	February 10, 2023	1 h 40 min	English
Escola de Quebrada	Comedy	March 3, 2023	1 h	Portuguese
Death's Roulette	Thriller	May 5, 2023	1 h 33 min	Spanish
Zoey 102	Comedy drama	July 27, 2023	1 h 41 min	English
The Appleton Ladies' Potato Race	Comedy drama	July 27, 2023	1 h 48 min	English
Love in Taipei	Coming-of-age romantic drama	August 10, 2023	1 h 35 min	English
Pet Sematary: Bloodlines	Supernatural horror	October 6, 2023	1 h 27 min	English
The Rescue: The Weight of the World	Political thriller	November 3, 2023	1 h 35 min	Spanish
Good Burger 2	Comedy	November 22, 2023	1 h 30 min	English
Finestkind	Crime thriller	December 15, 2023	2 h, 6 min	English
The Tiger's Apprentice	Animated action adventure	February 2, 2024	1 h 24 min	English
Little Wing	Coming-of-age	March 13, 2024	1 h 39 min	English
Apartment 7A	Psychological horror	September 27, 2024	1 h 44 min	English
Dear Santa	Christmas comedy	November 25, 2024	1 h 48 min	English
Star Trek: Section 31	Science fiction	January 24, 2025	1 h 30 min	English
Vicious	Supernatural horror	October 10, 2025	1 h 43 min	English
Avatar Aang: The Last Airbender	Fantasy action	July 25, 2026	1 h 39 min	English

=== Documentaries ===
Title	Release date	Runtime	Language
Console Wars	September 23, 2020	1 h 31 min	English
76 Days	March 4, 2021	1 h 33 min	English
Hunger Ward	April 2, 2021	40 min	English
Going to Pot: The High and Low of It	April 20, 2021	1 h 13 min	English
Cher & The Loneliest Elephant	April 22, 2021	46 min	English
Sir Alex Ferguson: Never Give In	May 29, 2021	1 h 49 min	English
Woman in Motion: Nichelle Nichols, Star Trek and the Remaking of NASA	June 3, 2021	1 h 36 min	English
Bring Your Own Brigade	August 20, 2021	2 h, 7 min	English
26th Street Garage: The FBI's Untold Story of 9/11	September 9, 2021	58 min	English
Destination Porto: The Unimaginable Journey	September 28, 2021	1 h 26 min	English
Unknown Dimension: The Story of Paranormal Activity	October 29, 2021	1 h 35 min	English
Ascension	November 15, 2021	1 h 38 min	English
Sabaya	November 15, 2021	1 h 32 min	English
Oasis Knebworth 1996	November 19, 2021	1 h 50 min	English
Bree Wayy: Promise Witness Remembrance	November 22, 2021	32 min	English
Coded: The Hidden Love of J.C. Leyendecker	November 22, 2021	29 min	English
Lynching Postcards: "Token of a Great Day"	November 22, 2021	15 min	English
R.I.P. T-Shirts	November 22, 2021	31 min	English
The Musician	November 22, 2021	15 min	English
The Marfa Tapes	January 20, 2022	58 min	English
Love, Tom	February 24, 2022	56 min	English
Secrets of the Oligarch Wives	June 28, 2022	1 h 23 min	English
The Only	July 12, 2022	1 h 42 min	English
The Day the Music Died: The Story of Don McLean's "American Pie"	July 19, 2022	1 h 34 min	English
Destination Paris	September 6, 2022	1 h 33 min	English
Liam Gallagher: Knebworth 22	December 6, 2022	1 h 27 min	English
Gucci: Sex, Money and Power	February 15, 2023	1 h 30 min	English
King Charles: The Boy Who Walked Alone	May 2, 2023	1 h 26 min	English
Mixtape	August 1, 2023	1 h 26 min	English
Reinventing Elvis: The '68 Comeback	August 15, 2023	1 h 50 min	English
Superpower	September 18, 2023	1 h 58 min	English
Louis Tomlinson: All of Those Voices	October 4, 2023	1 h 47 min	English
Milli Vanilli	October 24, 2023	1 h 46 min	English
JFK: What the Doctors Saw	November 14, 2023	1 h 32 min	English
The Choice is Yours	November 21, 2023	1 h 49 min	English
Simple Minds: Everything is Possible	December 22, 2023	1 h 27 min	English
June	January 16, 2024	1 h 38 min	English
Becoming King	February 19, 2024	1 h 6 min	English
As We Speak: Rap Music on Trial	February 27, 2024	1 h 36 min	English
500 Days in the Wild	March 15, 2024	2 h 5 min	English
Kiss the Future	May 7, 2024	1 h 43 min	English
Let the Canary Sing	June 4, 2024	1 h 38 min	English
We Will Dance Again	September 24, 2024	1 h 31 min	English
Larger Than Life: Reign of the Boybands	November 12, 2024	1 h 35 min	English
The French Montana Story: For Khadija	November 19, 2024	1 h 27 min	English
Bodyguard of Lies	September 23, 2025	1 h 30 min	English
Ozzy: No Escape from Now	October 7, 2025	2 h 3 min	English

=== Specials ===
Title	Genre	Release date	Length	Language
Kacey Musgraves: Star-crossed	Visual album	September 10, 2021 (Note: Alongside with the album release; United States only)	50 min	English
74th Tony Awards	Award show	September 26, 2021	1 h 43 min	English
Madame X	Concert film	October 8, 2021 (Note: United States, Canada, Latin America, the Nordics and Australia)	1 h 57 min	English
Madame X Presents: Madame Xtra Q&A	Making-of documentary	November 18, 2021	37 min	English
Porta dos Fundos: Te Prego Lá Fora	Animated comedy	December 15, 2021	31 min	Portuguese
Liam Gallagher Live: Knebworth 22	Concert film	December 6, 2022	1 h 19 min	English
Francesco, Il Cantico	Public reading	December 8, 2022	1 h 9 min	Italian
The JLO Show: Live in Las Vegas	Concert film	November 26, 2026		English

== Upcoming original films ==
=== Feature films ===
Title	Genre	Release date	Runtime	Language
Staycation	Christmas family film	TBA	TBA	English

=== Documentaries ===
Title	Release date	Runtime	Language
Protest and Progress	TBA	TBA	English

== See also ==
- List of TVING original films
