= Karma's a Bitch =

- Original cover (Note: Original cover art is in color, newer versions are in black and white.)

Single by Brit Smith
- Released: April 13, 2024
- Recorded: 2012
- Genre: Dance-pop; electropop
- Length: 3:45
- Songwriters: Rock Mafia; Desmond Child
- Producers: Rock Mafia; Timbaland

Brit Smith singles chronology
"Provocative (hiDhi)" (2013)	"Karma's a Bitch" (2024)	"Chocolates and Lies" (2024)

"Karma's a Bitch" is a song by American singer Brit Smith. It was written by Antonina Armato, Tim James, and Desmond Child in 2011 and was intended to be Smith's debut single, but was later shelved. Following the release of the heavily panned version "Karma" by JoJo Siwa in April 2024, Smith's original "Karma’s a Bitch" was released as a single after gaining traction online.

== Background ==
In 2011, Miley Cyrus allegedly recorded the song "Karma's a Bitch", which was written for her. However, the song was scrapped due to her contract with Disney at the time. It was then offered to Brit Smith, who re-recorded the song to her liking in 2012 as her planned debut single. However, Interscope Records encouraged her to release the song "Provocative" instead in 2013. After "Provocative" underperformed, Smith left the music industry.

"Karma's a Bitch" was produced by Rock Mafia and Timbaland (who also appears in the music video), in 2012 but they shelved it until independently releasing it on April 13, 2024. The recording garnered viral attention on TikTok following JoJo Siwa's April 5 release of the same year, resurfacing a March 2013 music video on Vimeo and prompting the single's official release.

== Reception ==
"Karma's a Bitch" garnered a positive reception online compared to Siwa's version, which was professionally released first. Smith's version received praise for its "banging hook" and production by Timbaland.

== Music video ==
The music video was directed by Marc Klasfeld, who also directed the video for Siwa's version. It was originally uploaded to Vimeo on March 20, 2013. The shots of Smith and accompanying individuals were shot prior and the graphics were later added by Super77, an animation and design studio located in Columbus, Ohio. It features Smith at a church, club and in her bedroom as she attempts to get a man back after she is caught cheating.

== Charts ==
Chart performance for "Karma's a Bitch"
Chart (2024)	Peak position
UK Singles Sales (OCC)	40
US Digital Song Sales (Billboard)	12
US Hot Dance/Electronic Songs (Billboard)	18
