= Richy Jackson =

American dancer, creative director, and choreographer

Richard Jackson
- Born: San Francisco Bay Area, United States

Comedy career
- Years active: 1999–present
- Medium: Dancer, choreographer, television personality
- Genres: Dance/choreography, reality television

Richard "Richy" Jackson is an American dancer, creative director, and choreographer from the San Francisco Bay Area best known for his work with Lady Gaga. Jackson has a lifelong interest in dance, and after seeing school friend Aaliyah on television, he left Tuskegee University in 1999 and moved to Los Angeles to pursue dance as a career.

Jackson has danced for several artists including Missy Elliott and Usher, and was an assistant choreographer to award-winning choreographer Michael Rooney. Jackson later worked as an assistant choreographer to Laurieann Gibson, choreographing, collaborating, and dancing with Lady Gaga as well as for artists including Cimorelli, Keri Hilson, Brandy, Katy Perry, and Nicki Minaj. In November 2011, Lady Gaga ended her professional relationship with Gibson and appointed Jackson as her choreographer and visual director.

In 2012 Jackson served as visual director and choreographer for Lady Gaga's Born This Way Ball tour and featured as a judge on Lifetime television's Abby's Ultimate Dance Competition. Jackson also has dance credits in several films and television commercials.

== Music videos ==
=== Choreography ===
- 2004 – Kimberley Locke – "8th World Wonder"
- 2004 – Mis-Teeq – "One Night Stand"
- 2005 – JoJo – "Not That Kinda Girl"
- 2005 – JoJo – "Leave (Get Out)"
- 2008 – Lady Gaga – "Just Dance"
- 2008 – Lady Gaga – "Beautiful, Dirty, Rich"
- 2008 – Lady Gaga – "Poker Face"
- 2009 – Lady Gaga – "LoveGame"
- 2009 – Lady Gaga – "Paparazzi"
- 2009 – Lady Gaga – "Bad Romance"
- 2010 – Lady Gaga – "Telephone"
- 2010 – Lady Gaga – "Alejandro"
- 2010 – Katy Perry – "California Gurls"
- 2010 – Keri Hilson – "The Way You Love Me"
- 2010 – Keri Hilson – "Pretty Girl Rock"
- 2011 – Lady Gaga – "Born This Way"
- 2011 – Lady Gaga – "Judas"
- 2011 – Keri Hilson – "Lose Control"
- 2011 – JoJo – "The Other Chick"
- 2011 – Cimorelli – "Million Bucks"
- 2011 – Lady Gaga – "Yoü and I"
- 2011 – Lady Gaga – "Marry the Night"
- 2012 – Karmin – "Brokenhearted"
- 2012-13 – Lady Gaga – Born This Way Ball
- 2013 – Priyanka – "In My City"
- 2013 – Priyanka – "Exotic"
- 2013 – Karmin – "Acapella"
- 2013 – Lady Gaga – "Applause"
- 2013 – Krewella – Get Wet Tour
- 2013 – Lady Gaga – iTunes Festival
- 2013 – Lady Gaga – ArtRAVE
- 2013 – Lady Gaga – Jingle Bell Ball
- 2013 – To Be One – "Do You"
- 2014 – Lady Gaga - "G.U.Y."
- 2014 – Lady Gaga - Lady Gaga Live at Roseland Ballroom
- 2014 – Lady Gaga - ArtRave: The Artpop Ball
- 2017 – Lady Gaga - "John Wayne"
- 2017 – Lady Gaga - Coachella Valley Music and Arts Festival
- 2017 – Lady Gaga - Joanne World Tour
- 2020 - Lady Gaga - "Stupid Love"
- 2020 - Lady Gaga - "Rain On Me"
- 2020 - Lady Gaga - "911"
- 2024 - JoJo Siwa - "Karma"

=== As a dancer ===
- 2001 – *NSYNC – "Pop"
- 2001 – Blu Cantrell – "Hit 'Em Up Style (Oops!)"
- 2001 – Usher – "U-Turn"
- 2002 – JC Chasez – "Blowin' Me Up (With Her Love)"
- 2003 – Missy Elliott – "Gossip Folks"
- 2008 – Lady Gaga – "Beautiful, Dirty, Rich"
- 2008 - Lady Gaga - "Love Game"
- 2009 – Lady Gaga – "Paparazzi"
- 2010 – Lady Gaga – "Telephone"
- 2010 – Keri Hilson – "Pretty Girl Rock"
- 2011 – Lady Gaga – "Born This Way"
- 2011 – Lady Gaga – "Judas"

== Filmography ==
=== Film ===
- 2003 – Honey – assistant choreographer
- 2003 – Malibu's Most Wanted – assistant choreographer
- 2004 – You Got Served – dancer
- 2004 – A Cinderella Story – dancer
- 2004 – Fat Albert – dancer
- 2009 – Alvin and the Chipmunks: The Squeakquel – Chipmunk dancer
- 2018 – A Star Is Born – choreographer

=== Television ===
- 2003-2005 – Making the Band – multiple on-camera appearances
- 2009 – 2009 MTV Video Music Awards – dancer
- 2011 – The Dance Scene – series regular
- 2011 – Born to Dance – series regular
- 2012-2013 – Abby's Ultimate Dance Competition – judge
- 2013 – 2013 MTV Video Music Awards – choreographer for Lady Gaga
- 2013 – Lady Gaga and the Muppets Holiday Spectacular – visual producer and choreographer
