= Guilty Pleasure (EP) =

EP by JoJo Siwa
- Released: July 12, 2024
- Genres: Dance-pop; EDM; electropop
- Length: 12:44
- Label: Columbia
- Producers: The Futuristics; Rock Mafia; Nick Monson; DJ White Shadow; Peter Thomas; Justin Trainor; Dino Zisis

JoJo Siwa chronology
The J Team (Original Motion Picture Soundtrack) (2021)	Guilty Pleasure (2024)	Boomerang 10th Anniversary (2026)

Singles from Guilty Pleasure
- 1. "Karma" Released: April 5, 2024; 2. "Guilty Pleasure" Released: July 12, 2024

Guilty Pleasure is the fourth extended play (EP) by American singer JoJo Siwa, released on July 12, 2024, through Columbia Records. It marks her first musical project following her departure from Nickelodeon and represents a significant artistic rebrand, moving away from her previous child-friendly image toward a more mature, "edgy" style heavily influenced by dance-pop and electropop. The EP was preceded by the lead single, "Karma" and the subsequent title track.

The EP has received mixed reviews from critics, who criticized the production, lack of artistic direction, songwriting and Siwa’s vocal performance.

== Background and development ==
In 2017, Siwa signed a multi-platform talent deal with Nickelodeon, under which she released child-friendly pop music and consumer merchandise characterized by signature hair bows and colorful aesthetics. Following her departure from the network, Siwa signed with Columbia Records and initiated a deliberate transition toward an adult public persona and musical career, citing Miley Cyrus' 2013 Bangerz era transformation as an inspiration for the shift.

The rollout for the EP began in early April 2024 with the release of the lead single "Karma" which was accompanied by a heavily publicized visual rebrand at the iHeartRadio Music Awards featuring dark, leather outfits and dramatic face paint that was described as "Kiss-Inspired". In an interview with Billboard prior to the EP's release, Siwa generated significant online discourse by expressing a desire to pioneer a "new genre" she referred to as "gay pop" later clarifying to news outlets that she was not its inventor but wanted to elevate the visibility of queer pop styles.

On June 30, 2024, following a series of live performances at nationwide Pride events, including premiering the title track at Trixie Mattel's Pride celebration in Central Park, Siwa officially announced the title and track listing of Guilty Pleasure. In social media statements accompanying the announcement, Siwa noted that the five-track EP was developed over a seven-month period during both "dark times and happy times".

== Composition and lyrics ==
The album is predominantly dance-pop, EDM, and electropop, evoking nostalgic sounds from 2012.

== Critical reception ==
Professional ratings
Review scores
Source	Rating
Rolling Stone	2.5/5 stars
HIVE Magazine	2/5 stars

Guilty Pleasure received generally mixed reviews. Rolling Stone referred to the record as an "identity crisis", while HIVE Magazine, called it her "wrecking ball" moment. The Daily Illini noted that Siwa utilized synthesizers and dance-pop instrumentation for catchy pop songs, drawing a clear inspiration from Miley Cyrus's rebrand. However, the review critiqued certain tracks for carrying too much of Siwa's previous child-star sound, while also highlighting the lyrical shift in "Choose Ur Fighter", which was seen as a move away from her previous anti-bullying advocacy.

Vulture noted the title track "Guilty Pleasure" as "thumping and nonspecific electronic-pop" with a prominent hyperpop sound. The Cut called the song "a relic from 2012" complimenting its nostalgic sound.

Fans of the rock band Tool heavily criticized Siwa and accused her of stealing the band's "wrench design" for her own merch for the EP.

== Track listing ==
Guilty Pleasure track listing
No.	Title	Writer(s)	Producer(s)	Length
1.	"Guilty Pleasure"	Bagel Man; Dino Zisis; JoJo Siwa; Justin Trainor; Meghan Trainor; Nick Monson; Paul Blair	DJ White Shadow; Dino Zisis; Monson; J. Trainor	2:35
2.	"Balance Baby"	Alex Schwartz; Cate Downey; Joe Khajadourian; Nate Cyphert; Richie Gattz	The Futuristics	2:21
3.	"Yesterday's Tomorrow's Today"	Antonina Armato; Siwa; Thomas Sturges; Tim James	Rock Mafia	2:32
4.	"Choose Ur Fighter"	Emeline Easton; Peter Thomas; Sarah Solovay; Sean Kennedy	Thomas	2:09
5.	"Karma"	Armato; Desmond Child; James	Rock Mafia	3:07
Total length:				12:44

== Release history ==
Release history and formats for Guilty Pleasure
Region	Date	Label	Format
Various	July 12, 2024	Columbia	Digital download; streaming
