= Mulberry Lane =

Pop-rock vocal group of four sisters from Omaha, Nebraska

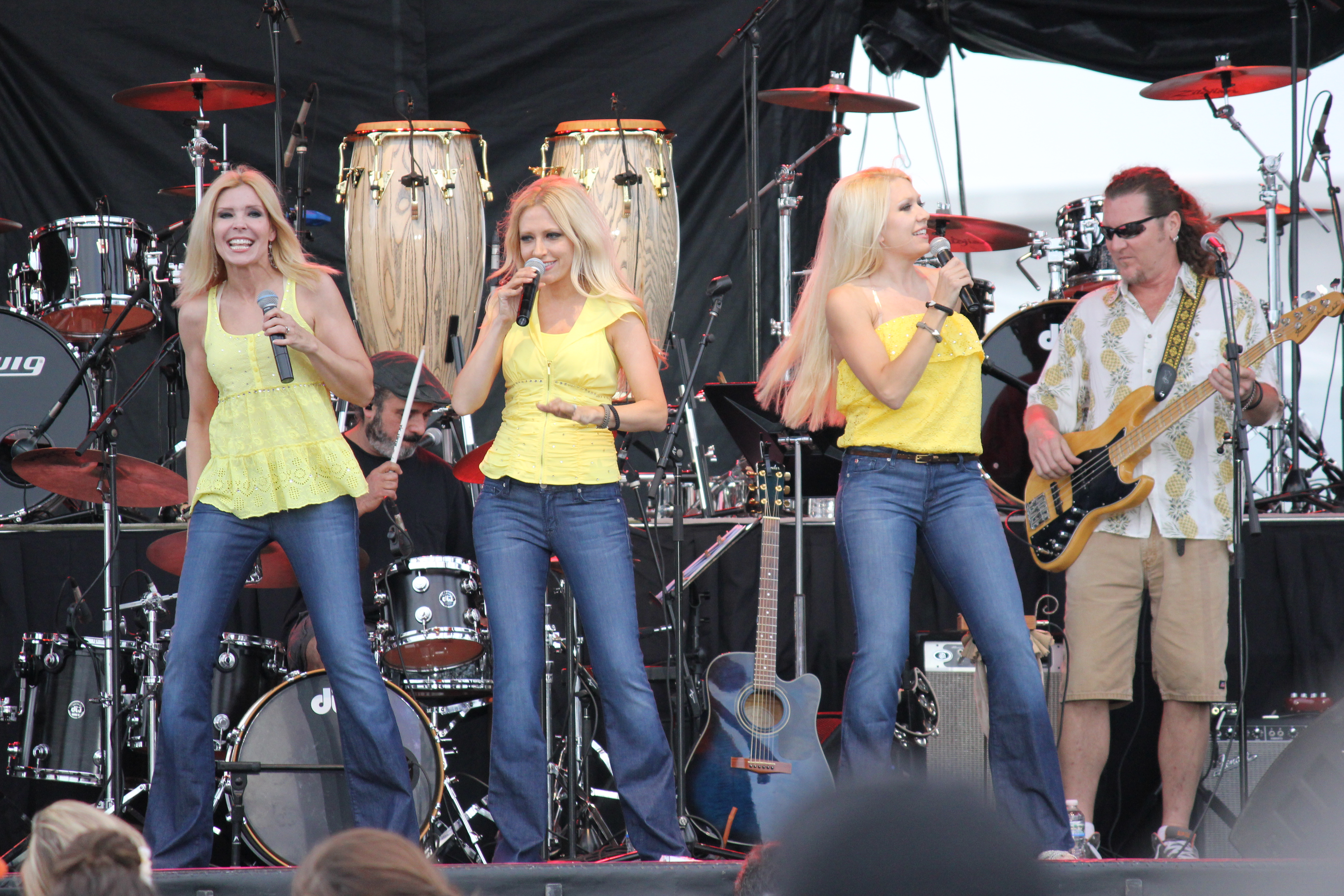
- Mulberry Lane performing at Loessfest in Council Bluffs, Iowa in 2013.

Background information
- Origin: Omaha, Nebraska
- Genre: soft rock
- Years active: 1998 –2018
- Labels: MCA Records; World Egg
- Past members: Heather Rizzuto; Rachel Rizzuto; Allie Rizzuto; Jaymie Jones
- Website: mulberrylane.com

Mulberry Lane was a pop music singer-songwriter vocal group from Omaha, Nebraska. The group consists of the Rizzuto sisters, Heather, Rachel, Allie, and Jaymie.

== Charts ==
Their 1999 single, "Harmless", from the album, Run Your Own Race, reached number 23 on the Billboard adult contemporary chart and number 99 on the Billboard Hot 100. "Harmless" also reached #6 on the pop charts in Japan. "Just One Breath" continues to receive airplay in Ireland, France, Germany and Austria. "Christmas in Nebraska" is popular in Nebraska during the holiday season. Mulberry Lane has released multiple albums, and had a Midwest holiday tour for several years.

Jaymie Jones and her daughter Kelli recorded one extended play in 2018 as the duo the Belles. Kelli became a solo artist in 2021 under the name Belles.

== Radio ==
From 2011–2020, Rachel, Heather and Allie hosted The Mulberry Lane Show, a music and lifestyle radio show that aired on Midwest talk radio stations.

== Discography ==
Mulberry Lane discography
Year	Title	Label
1998	Don't Cry Till You Get to the Car	Peacock Alley
1999	Run Your Own Race	Refuge Records / MCA
2001	Fabu album review	MCA Records
2004	A Very Mulberry Christmas: Nebraska Version	World Egg
2006	A Very Mulberry Christmas: Iowa Version	World Egg
2006	A Very Mulberry Christmas: Wisconsin Version	World Egg
2006	Snug	World Egg
2006	Stars and Stripes and Sisters Forever	World Egg
2008	Christmas Spirit	World Egg
2010	Christmas with Mulberry Lane: Live	World Egg
