= Let It Go (Brit & Alex song) =

Single by Brit & Alex

from the album Step Up 2: The Streets
- B-side: "Sleepless"; "I Like Boys"
- Released: March 3, 2008 (US); March 31, 2008 (UK)
- Recorded: 2007
- Genre: Dance-pop, hip hop
- Length: 3:20
- Label: Interscope
- Songwriter(s): Theron Feemster, KeAna Pratt, Mischke, Rinat Arinos
- Producer(s): Theron Feemster

Brit & Alex singles chronology
"Let It Go" (2008)	"Get What I Want" (2010)

"Let It Go" is the debut single by American duo Brit & Alex. It was released through Interscope on March 3, 2008. The track was written and produced by Theron Feemster. It was included on the soundtrack album for the 2008 film Step Up 2: The Streets. It was later released in the United Kingdom as a CD format on April 28, 2008.

The song peaked at number 75 on the UK Singles Downloads Chart.

== Track listing ==
=== UK 2-track CD single ===
1. "Let It Go" (3:23)
2. "Sleepless" (3:47)

=== UK CD maxi-single ===
1. "Let It Go" (Album Version) (3:23)
2. "Let It Go" (Moto Blanco Club Mix) (7:38)
3. "Let It Go" (Chris Cox Club Mix) (6:45)
4. "I Like Boys" (Chris Cox Club Mix) (10:16)

== Charts ==
Chart performance for "Let It Go"
Chart (2008)	Peak position
UK Singles (OCC)	75
