= Boomerang (JoJo Siwa song) =

2016 single by JoJo Siwa

Single by JoJo Siwa
- Released: May 6, 2016
- Recorded: 2016
- Genre: Bubblegum pop
- Length: 3:26
- Label: JoJo Siwa Entertainment
- Songwriters: Griffith Frank; Heather Miley; Jordan Richman; JoJo Siwa
- Producer: Jordan Richman

JoJo Siwa singles chronology
| "Boomerang" (2016) | "Kid in a Candy Store" (2017) |

Music video
- "Boomerang" on YouTube

"Boomerang" is the debut official single by American singer JoJo Siwa. The song was released on May 6, 2016, through JoJo Siwa Entertainment. The song was written by Griffith Frank, Heather Miley, Jordan Richman, and Siwa. Jordan Richman produced the record with Heather Miley as co-producer.

== Description ==
"Boomerang" is an upbeat song that deals with the issue of cyberbullying or normal bullying. The song's message is to achieve a triumph over bullies everywhere. Siwa clarifies, "there are two ways to deal with bullies. Bully them back, or tell them politely what they're doing wrong."

== Music video ==
The music video directed by Monseé Wood was released on May 17, 2016. As of April 29, 2024, the music video had been viewed on YouTube over 1 billion times. The video features Jessalynn Siwa (her mother) and the former Dance Moms cast; Sydney and Halle, Siwa’s friends from the show played her BFFs in the video. Kendall, another dancer from the show, played the lead mean girl. Jill, Kendall’s mother, played the teacher in the video. As of July 2022, it has over 5 million likes and 1 million dislikes.

== Commercial performance ==
On February 24, 2017, the single was certified Gold by the Recording Industry Association of America (RIAA). On August 31, 2017, the song was certified Platinum by the RIAA.

== Certifications ==
Certifications for "Boomerang"
| Region | Certification | Certified units/sales |
|---|---|---|
| United States (RIAA) | 2× Platinum | 2,000,000^{‡} |
^{‡} Sales+streaming figures based on certification alone.
