= JoJo Siwa =

American singer and dancer (born 2003)

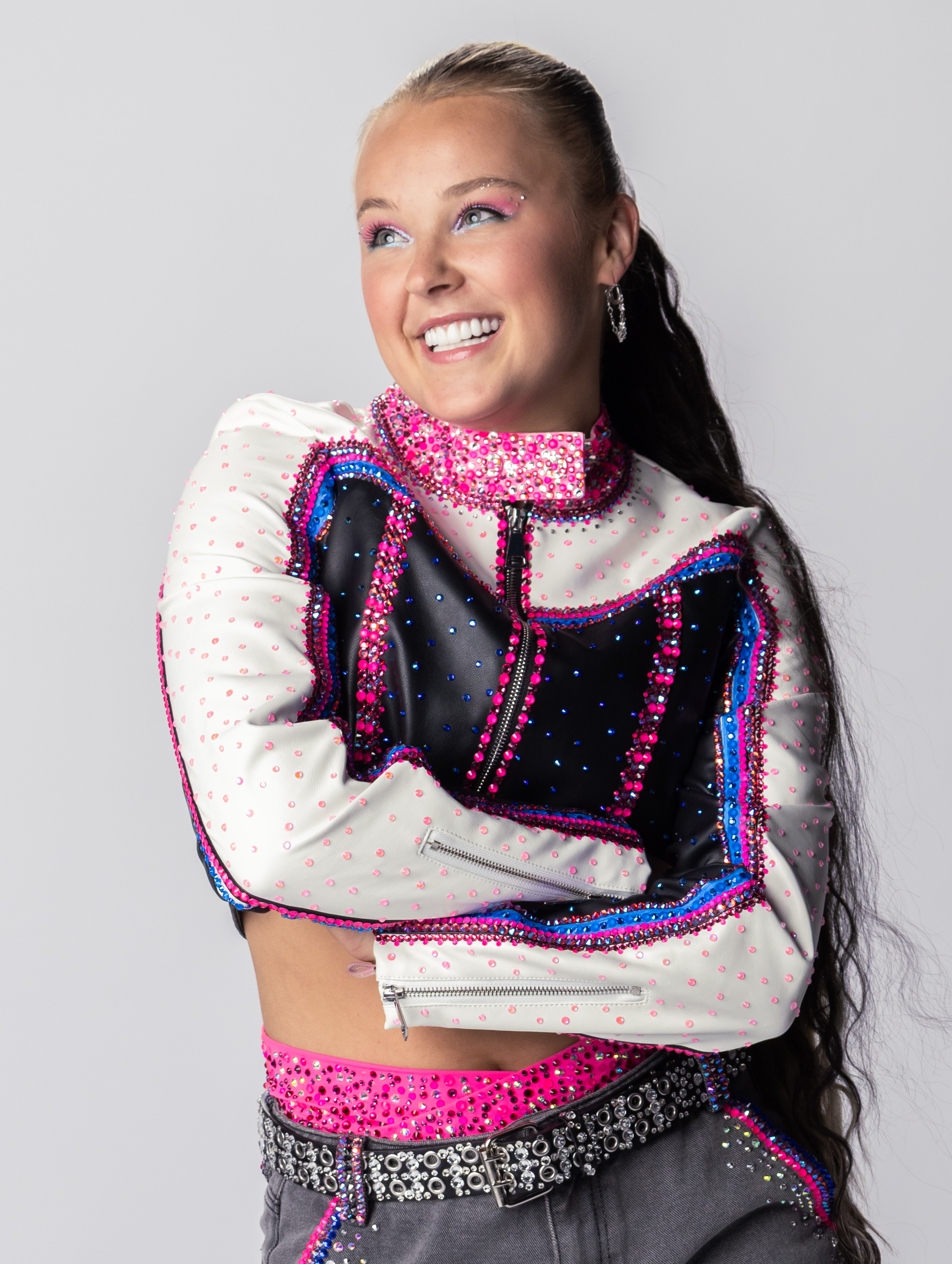
- Siwa in 2025
- Born: Joelle Joanie Siwa; May 19, 2003 (age 23); Omaha, Nebraska, U.S.
- Occupations: Singer; dancer; actress; media personality
- Years active: 2013–present
- Musical career
- Genres: Pop; electropop; dance-pop
- Instrument: Vocals
- Labels: Columbia; Republic; Nick
- Website: jojosiwa.com

Joelle Joanie Siwa (/ˈsiːwɑː/ SEE-wah; born May 19, 2003), known professionally as JoJo Siwa, is an American singer, dancer, actress, and media personality. From 2015 to 2016, she appeared as a dancer on two seasons of the reality television show Dance Moms alongside her mother, Jessalynn Siwa. She was included on Time's annual list of the 100 most influential people in the world in 2020.

In 2017, Siwa signed to Nickelodeon and acted in various television shows and films. With Nickelodeon, she released several children's songs and her own feature film, The J Team, in 2021. The music video to her song "Boomerang" has been viewed over 1 billion times on YouTube. In 2024, Siwa initiated her post-Nickelodeon career with the extended play Guilty Pleasure, led by the single "Karma". The following year, she was a contestant on the 24th series of the British reality television show Celebrity Big Brother and left the house in third place.

== Early life ==
Joelle Joanie Siwa was born in Omaha, Nebraska, on May 19, 2003, to Jessalynn Siwa (née Lombardi), a professional dance instructor from Iowa, and Tom Siwa, a chiropractor from Nebraska. Her father is of Polish descent. She has one sibling, an older brother named Jayden Siwa, who was previously also a vlogger; as of 2024 he works as a real estate agent.

== Career ==
=== 2013–2019: Dance Moms, breakthrough with music and Nickelodeon ===
Siwa started her career as a top-5 finalist and the youngest contestant on the second season of Abby's Ultimate Dance Competition, produced by Abby Lee Miller of Dance Moms fame. She appeared on the show with her mother and was eliminated in week 9, having been in the bottom two with Kalani. Siwa soon began to appear on Dance Moms, beginning with auditioning for Miller's "ALDC" dance competition team in 2014 and being selected for the team in early 2015.

In May 2016, Siwa released her songs "Boomerang" and "I Can Make U Dance". "Boomerang" addresses the subject of online bullying. Its music video has been viewed over 1 billion times and received over 5 million likes. Also in 2016, Siwa released a line of hair bows in a collaboration with fashion accessory and jewelry company Claire's. The line of hair bows, which were inspired by the hair bows that were Siwa's signature accessory during this period, experienced particular success among primary school pupils in the United Kingdom, where some schools took to banning them for a variety of reasons, including peer pressure, causing distraction from work, the impairment of pupils' concentration, and violation of school dress policies. Due to the bows' popularity, some stores also began selling similar bows. Siwa commented that her bows were a "symbol of power, confidence, believing-ness." Claire's recalled a JoJo Siwa-branded cosmetics kit product in 2019 after the FDA issued a warning about it containing dangerous levels of asbestos.

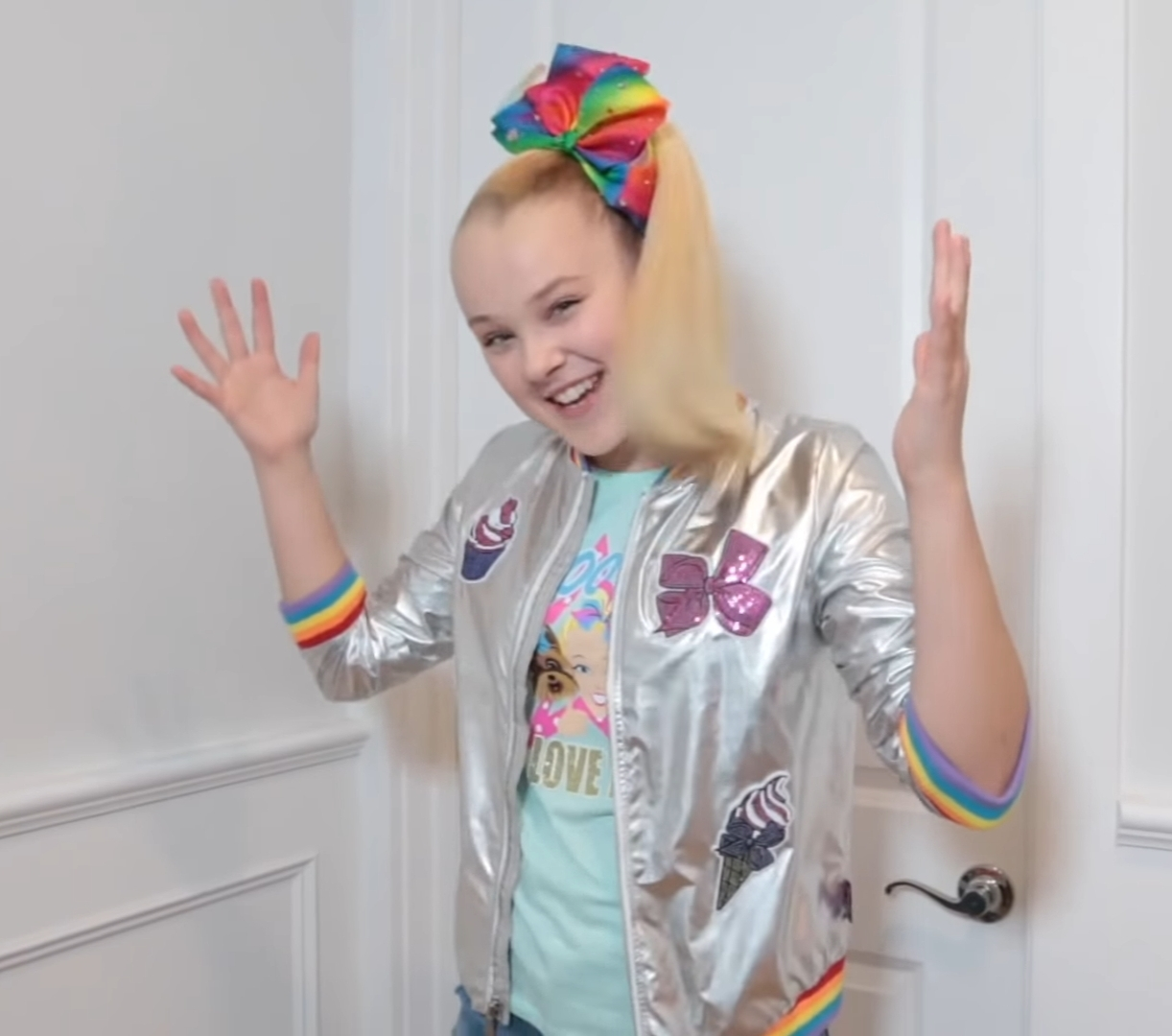
Siwa in September 2018

Siwa signed with Nickelodeon in 2017, appearing in the film Blurt! with Jace Norman and the show Lip Sync Battle Shorties with Nick Cannon. Siwa partnered with the American department store J. C. Penney in 2018 to release a line of accessories, bedroom decor, and a doll made in her likeness, and has released several books aimed at young children. In 2018, Siwa was named the Breakout Artist of the Year by Vivid Seats. Siwa then announced that she would be going on her first major concert tour in 2019, entitled D.R.E.A.M. The Tour. She was scheduled to visit a total of 52 cities across the United States, United Kingdom, Canada, and Australia. The tour was scheduled to begin in Phoenix, Arizona on May 17 and conclude in Vancouver, British Columbia on August 20.

=== 2020–2023: Continued television work and other ventures ===
In 2020, Siwa competed in season three of The Masked Singer as "T-Rex". At the age of sixteen, she was the youngest contestant to appear on the show until Honey Boo Boo performed as one half of "Beach Ball" in season six and later Marsai Martin as "Woodpecker" in season twelve. Siwa appeared as a playable character in the 2020 video game Nickelodeon Kart Racers 2: Grand Prix, as well at its 2022 sequel Nickelodeon Kart Racers 3: Slime Speedway. She was included on Time's annual list of the 100 most influential people in the world in September 2020 and on Fast Company's Queer 50 list in 2021.

In 2021, Siwa competed on the thirtieth season of Dancing with the Stars, in which she was part of the first same-sex dancing partnership in the show's history. She and her partner, Jenna Johnson, ultimately placed 2nd. In January 2021, the board game JoJo's Juice, marketed for children aged 6 and above, was withdrawn from sales by game makers Nickelodeon and Spin Master after a controversy over the game's content, which included questions about nudity and being arrested. Siwa responded that month, stating that she was not informed about the game's questions, and opined that "my name and my image have been used to promote this board game that has some really inappropriate content … I was really, really, really upset at how gross these questions were". In the same year, General Mills started producing a breakfast cereal called JoJo Siwa Strawberry Bop, consisting of strawberry-flavored sweetened corn puffs with marshmallows shaped like yellow and white stars, pink bows, and blue hearts.

Later in 2021, Siwa starred as a fictionalized version of herself in The J Team, a Nickelodeon musical film that she also executive produced, which premiered on Paramount+.

On April 4, 2022, she was announced as a judge for the seventeenth season of So You Think You Can Dance, along with Matthew Morrison and Stephen "tWitch" Boss. In June, Siwa hosted iHeartRadio's 2022 Can't Cancel Pride event. On September 9, 2022, she was announced as the recipient of the Gamechanger Award from GLSEN for her anti-bullying advocacy efforts. In December 2022, she hosted the inaugural Children's & Family Emmy Awards.

Also in 2022, Siwa had a new show on Facebook Watch called "Jojo Goes", documenting some adventures of her and her friends.

In 2023, during the seventeenth season of America's Got Talent, JoJo and Jessalynn reformed the group XOMG Pop which had previously appeared on Siwa's Dance Pop Revolution and as a guest act on D.R.E.A.M. the Tour. Although the band lost the semifinals, they went on to release several singles, music videos, and an album titled Party Like a Popstar. In December 2023, Siwa performed "Step in Time" from the 1964 movie Mary Poppins on the primetime CBS special Dick Van Dyke: 98 Years of Magic.

=== 2024–2025: First rebrand, "gay pop" controversy, and Guilty Pleasure ===
On January 26, 2024, she was announced to be returning as a judge for the eighteenth season of So You Think You Can Dance, replacing Nigel Lythgoe, who had earlier announced his withdrawal from the upcoming season.

At the 2024 iHeartRadio Music Awards, Siwa appeared in a black mesh bodysuit and black makeup resembling the style of the American rock band Kiss. The look was later revealed to be the costume used for the "Karma beast" character in the music video for "Karma", which had not yet been released at the time, leading to confusion and widespread media attention.

On April 5, 2024, Siwa released "Karma", her official debut single as an adult artist, which received mostly negative reviews and generated online backlash. Siwa described it as her "first breakout adult moment" after performing for eleven years with a child-friendly image. In an interview with Billboard, she expressed a desire to "start a new genre of music ... It's called gay pop." Following viral backlash and negative criticism from queer musicians Tegan and Sara, Siwa clarified her position in a later interview. "I am not the inventor of gay pop, for sure not. ... I might not be the president, but I might be the CEO, or the CMO." She also denounced online critiques of her comments, adding, "I could say I want world peace. And everyone would be like, 'how dare you want peace for the world.' It'll blow up."

In July 2024, she released her fourth EP, titled Guilty Pleasure. The fourth track from the project, "Choose Ur Fighter", was released as a single with an accompanying music video on January 1 the following year. The song was originally written by another artist, Emeline, who released her own recording of the song in February of the same year.

In August 2024, Siwa expressed interest in participating in the Eurovision Song Contest, specifically wanting to represent Poland due to her Polish heritage. She said that she was in contact with Polish public service broadcaster Telewizja Polska (TVP) about her potential participation, but they denied this, issuing a statement that they were not contacting musicians at the time nor making decisions about participation in Eurovision.

=== 2025–present: Celebrity Big Brother and second rebrand ===
In April 2025, Siwa was a contestant on the 24th series of the British reality television show Celebrity Big Brother and left the house in third place.

In July 2025, Siwa released a cover of "Bette Davis Eyes" (originally by Jackie DeShannon and popularized by Kim Carnes, the arrangement of the latter version of whom Siwa's is based on) on Instagram and TikTok. In the accompanying video, she appeared in a vintage-inspired look referencing Bette Davis, including a blonde wig, pearl necklace, and blue crop top.

In October 2025, Siwa embarked on the Infinity Heart Tour, performing across the United Kingdom and Europe. Later that month, Siwa received the Humanitarian Award at the Dancers Against Cancer (DAC) Gala of the Stars in recognition of her decade-long philanthropic work with the organisation.

== Personal life ==
Siwa was in a relationship with TikTok star Mark Bontempo from August to November 2020. Siwa came out as being part of the LGBTQ+ community on social media in January 2021, initially declining to label her sexuality. She later identified as pansexual, and subsequently as lesbian. During her time on Celebrity Big Brother in 2025, Siwa said she had begun to identify as queer rather than lesbian. In an April 2026 interview, Siwa further clarified that both pansexual and queer remained accurate labels for her sexuality.

Siwa had an on-and-off relationship with Kylie Prew from February 2021 to June 2022. She also dated social media content creator Avery Cyrus from August to December 2022, dancer Dakayla Wilson from August to November 2024, and non-binary Australian influencer and actor Kath Ebbs from January to April 2025.

Siwa met English television personality Chris Hughes on Celebrity Big Brother in April 2025. In June 2025, she confirmed that they had begun a romantic relationship.

== Filmography ==
=== Television ===
| Year | Title | Role | Notes |
|---|---|---|---|
| 2013 | Abby's Ultimate Dance Competition | Contestant | 10 episodes |
| 2015 | The View | Herself | Performed in group dance "Together We Stand" |
| 2015 | Good Day L.A. | Herself | Guest |
| 2015 | Good Day New York | Herself | Guest |
| 2015–2016 | Dance Moms | Herself | Season 5–6 (62 episodes) |
| 2016 | Nickelodeon's Ultimate Halloween Costume Party | Ghost/Creepy Girl | |
| 2016 | Make It Pop | Herself | Episode: "Summer Splash Spectacular" |
| 2016 | Bizaardvark | Herself | Episode: "Bizaardvark vs. Vicki 'Hot Head' Fuego" |
| 2016 | The Thundermans | Nora's Fan | Episode: "Thundermans: Banished!" |
| 2017 | Nickelodeon's Not-So-Valentine Special | Girl with Heart/Dancer | |
| 2017 | Nickelodeon's Ultimate Halloween Haunted House | Herself | |
| 2017 | Lip Sync Battle Shorties | Herself | Main role |
| 2017 | School of Rock | Audrey | 2 episodes |
| 2017 | JoJo Siwa: My World | Herself | |
| 2018 | The JoJo and BowBow Show Show | Herself | |
| 2018 | Blurt! | Victoria | Television film |
| 2019 | JoJo's Dream Birthday | Herself | |
| 2019 | SpongeBob SquarePants | Herself (cameo) | Episode: "SpongeBob's Big Birthday Blowout" |
| 2019 | All That | Herself | Episode 1106 |
| 2019 | JoJo's Follow Your D.R.E.A.M. | Herself | |
| 2019 | Keeping Up with the Kardashians | Herself | Season 17, Episode: "Three's Company" |
| 2019 | JoJo's D.R.E.A.M. Concert | Herself | |
| 2019 | Middle School Moguls | Josie (voice) | Episode: "Mo-Gul Money, Mo Problems" |
| 2020 | The Substitute | Herself | Episode: "JoJo Siwa" |
| 2020 | The Masked Singer | Herself/T-Rex | |
| 2020 | Celebrity Watch Party | Herself | |
| 2021 | Celebrity Family Feud | Contestant | Season 7, episode 4 |
| 2021 | Dancing with the Stars | Herself | Contestant (season 30) |
| 2022 | So You Think You Can Dance | Herself/Judge | Season 17 |
| 2022 | America's Got Talent | Herself | Season 17 Premiere |
| 2022 | High School Musical: The Musical: The Series | Madison | Guest star |
| 2022 | 1st Children's and Family Emmy Awards | Herself/Host | December 10, 2022, ceremony |
| 2023 | RuPaul's Drag Race All Stars | Herself/Guest Judge | Season 8; Episode: "The Supermarket Ball" |
| 2023 | RuPaul's Drag Race All Stars: Untucked | Herself | Episode: "Untucked – The Supermarket Ball" |
| 2023 | Special Forces: World's Toughest Test | Herself | Season 2 |
| 2025 | Celebrity Big Brother | Herself/Housemate | British version, third place |
| 2025 | Escape the Night: The Lost Tapes | The Burnout | Miniseries on Tubi: continuation and conclusion of original webseries |
| 2025 | Hell's Kitchen | Herself | Feeding America contributor; Episode: "Charity in Hell" |
| 2026 | The Great Stand Up to Cancer Bake Off | Herself | Series 9, Episode 1 |
| 2026 | Nation's Dumbest | Herself/Contestant | |

=== Film ===
| Year | Title | Role | Notes |
|---|---|---|---|
| 2019 | The Angry Birds Movie 2 | Jay, Kira (voices) | |
| 2021 | The J Team | JoJo Siwa | |
| 2024 | AMFAD All My Friends Are Dead | Collette | |
| 2024 | Child Star | Herself | Documentary |

== Discography ==
=== Soundtrack albums ===
List of soundtrack albums
| Title | Details |
|---|---|
| The J Team (Original Motion Picture Soundtrack) | Released: August 27, 2021; Label: Republic; Format: Digital download, streaming |

=== Extended plays ===
List of EPs, with selected chart positions and certifications shown
| Title | Details | Peak chart positions |
| Title | Details | US Kid |
|---|---|---|
| D.R.E.A.M. The Music | Released: November 16, 2018; Label: Republic; Format: Digital download, streaming | 22 |
| Celebrate | Released: April 12, 2019; Label: Republic; Format: Digital download, streaming | 12 |
| JoJo's Rockin' Christmas | Released: November 13, 2020; Label: Republic; Format: Digital download, streaming | 17 |
| Guilty Pleasure | Released: July 12, 2024; Label: Columbia; Format: Digital download, streaming | — |
| Boomerang 10th Anniversary | Released: May 29, 2026; Label: JoJo Siwa Music; Format: Digital download, streaming | — |
"—" denotes an item that did not chart or was not released in that territory.

=== Singles ===
List of singles, with peak chart positions selected certifications, showing year released and album name
| Title | Year | Peak chart positions | | | | | | Certifications | Album |
| Title | Year | US Bub. | CAN | IRE | LTU Air. | NZ Hot | UK | Certifications | Album |
|---|---|---|---|---|---|---|---|---|---|
| "Boomerang" | 2016 | — | — | — | * | — | — | RIAA: 2× Platinum | Non-album singles |
| "Kid in a Candy Store" | 2017 | — | — | — | * | — | — | RIAA: Gold | Non-album singles |
| "Hold the Drama" | 2017 | — | — | — | * | — | — | RIAA: Gold | Non-album singles |
| "Every Girl's a Super Girl" | 2018 | — | — | — | * | — | — | | Non-album singles |
| "High Top Shoes" | 2018 | — | — | — | * | — | — | | Non-album singles |
| "Only Getting Better" | 2018 | — | — | — | * | — | — | | D.R.E.A.M. The Music |
| "Bop!" | 2019 | — | — | — | * | — | — | | Celebrate |
| "Nonstop" | 2020 | — | — | — | * | — | — | | Non-album single |
| "Karma" | 2024 | 22 | 100 | 93 | — | 24 | 76 | | Guilty Pleasure |
| "Guilty Pleasure" | 2024 | — | — | — | — | — | — | | Guilty Pleasure |
| "Iced Coffee" | 2024 | — | — | — | 70 | — | — | | Non-album singles |
| "Bulletproof" | 2025 | — | — | — | — | — | — | | Non-album singles |
| "Raspy" | 2025 | — | — | — | — | — | — (Note: "Raspy" did not enter the UK singles chart, but peaked at number 38 on the UK Singles Sales Chart and number 39 on the UK Singles Downloads Chart.) | | Non-album singles |
| "Infinity Heart" | 2025 | — | — | — | — | — | — (Note: "Infinity Heart" did not enter the UK singles chart, but peaked at number 54 on the UK Singles Sales Chart and number 49 on the UK Singles Downloads Chart.) | | Non-album singles |
| "Waste of a Heartbreak" | 2025 | — | — | — | — | — | — (Note: "Waste of a Heartbreak" did not enter the UK singles chart, but peaked at number 90 on the UK Singles Sales Chart and number 88 on the UK Singles Downloads Chart.) | | Non-album singles |
| "I'm Still Dancin'" | 2026 | — | — | — | — | — | — | | Non-album singles |
| "Serendipity" | 2026 | — | — | — | — | — | — | | Non-album singles |
| "Imma Come Back" | 2026 | — | — | — | — | — | — | | Boomerang 10th Anniversary |
"—" denotes an item that did not chart or was not released in that territory. "*" denotes the chart did not exist at that time.

=== Promotional singles ===
List of promotional singles, with peak chart positions, showing year released and album name
| Title | Year | Peak chart positions | | Album |
| Title | Year | UK Downloads | UK Sales | Album |
|---|---|---|---|---|
| "I Can Make U Dance" | 2015 | — | — | Non-album promotional single |
| "Choose Ur Fighter" | 2025 | — | — | Guilty Pleasure |
| "Bette Davis Eyes" | 2025 | 15 | 18 | Non-album promotional singles |
| "Message to the World (Little Drummer Girl)" | 2025 | 72 | 39 | Non-album promotional singles |
"—" denotes an item that did not chart or was not released in that territory.

== Awards and nominations ==
| Year | Award | Category | Nominated person or work | Result | Ref. |
|---|---|---|---|---|---|
| 2017 | Nickelodeon Kids' Choice Awards | Favorite Viral Music Artist | JoJo Siwa | Won | |
| 2018 | Nickelodeon Kids' Choice Awards | Favorite Musical YouTube Creator | JoJo Siwa | Won | |
| 2018 | IHeartRadio Music Awards | Social Star Award | JoJo Siwa | Nominated | |
| 2019 | Nickelodeon Kids' Choice Awards | Favorite TV Host | Nick Cannon & JoJo Siwa (Lip Sync Battle Shorties) | Nominated | |
| 2019 | Nickelodeon Kids' Choice Awards | Favorite Social Music Star | JoJo Siwa | Won | |
| 2019 | Streamy Awards | Kids and Family | JoJo Siwa | Won | |
| 2020 | Nickelodeon Kids' Choice Awards | Favorite Social Music Star | JoJo Siwa | Won | |
| 2020 | People's Choice Awards | The Social Star of 2020 | JoJo Siwa | Nominated | |
| 2021 | Nickelodeon Kids' Choice Awards | Favorite Social Music Star | JoJo Siwa | Nominated | |
| 2021 | People's Choice Awards | The Competition Contestant of 2021 | JoJo Siwa (Dancing with the Stars) | Won | |
| 2022 | Nickelodeon Kids' Choice Awards | Favorite Social Music Star | JoJo Siwa | Nominated | |
| 2022 | Children's and Family Emmy Awards | Outstanding Music Direction and Composition for a Live Action Program | The J Team | Nominated | |
| 2022 | Children's and Family Emmy Awards | Outstanding Choreography | Siwas Dance Pop Revolution | Nominated | |
| 2023 | Nickelodeon Kids' Choice Awards | Favorite Social Music Star | JoJo Siwa | Nominated | |

== Tours ==
=== Headlining ===
- D.R.E.A.M. The Tour (2019–2022)
- Infinity Heart Tour (2025)
