= Dance Moms season 4 =

Dance Moms
- Season 4
- Season 4 promotional poster
- Starring: Abby Lee Miller; Gianna Martello; Melissa Gisoni; Maddie Ziegler; Mackenzie Ziegler; Christi Lukasiak; Chloe Lukasiak; Kelly Hyland; Brooke Hyland; Paige Hyland; Holly Hatcher-Frazier; Nia Sioux; Jill Vertes; Kendall Vertes
- No. of episodes: 32 and 2 specials

Release
- Original network: Lifetime
- Original release: January 1 – October 14, 2014

Season chronology
- ← Previous; Season 3 Next → Season 5

The fourth season of Dance Moms, an American dance reality television created by Collins Avenue Productions, began airing on January 1, 2014 on Lifetime's television network. A total of 32 official episodes and 2 special episodes aired this season.

== Overview ==
Miller fears her Junior Elite Competition team doesn't show enough drive and threatens them by hosting nationwide open auditions for a new team. Although on a winning streak, tension rises between Miller and long-time client Kelly Hyland, and Miller finds herself in definite need of new dancers. Meanwhile, Melissa relishes in her daughters' successes with Mackenzie's blossoming music career and Maddie embracing new opportunities to dance. On the 100th episode, Miller unveils her new "Select Ensemble" for the first time. At the very end of the season, Chloe and Christi decide to leave the ALDC after a comment made by Miller regarding Chloe's medical condition.

== Cast ==
The fourth season featured sixteen star billing cast members in the first seven episodes, and thirteen from episode eight onwards, with various other dancers and moms appearing throughout the season. This season is also the last to feature Brooke Hyland, Paige Hyland, and Chloe Lukasiak as part of the ALDC team and the show as well as the first to feature Kalani Hilliker. (NOTE: Chloe only leaves the show temporarily. She returns in season seven.)

=== Junior Elite Team ===
- Maddie Ziegler
- Mackenzie Ziegler
- Brooke Hyland (episodes 1–7)
- Paige Hyland (episodes 1–7)
- Nia Sioux
- Chloe Lukasiak
- Kendall Vertes
- Kalani Hilliker (episodes 7-10, 13-16)

=== Junior Elite Team Moms ===
- Melissa Gisoni
- Holly Hatcher-Frazier
- Jill Vertes
- Christi Lukasiak
- Kelly Hyland (episodes 1–9)
- Kira Girard

=== Select Ensemble Team Dancers ===
- Tea' Adamson, a contemporary & musical theatre dancer from Fort Myers, Florida. She was brought on the show to rival Mackenzie. She was on the show until the end of season 4, when the ensemble team disbanded and she was dismissed.
- Kamryn Beck, a lyrical & contemporary dancer from Ephrata, Pennsylvania. She was brought on the show to rival Chloe. She was on the show until the end of season 4, when the ensemble team disbanded and she was dismissed.
- Jade Cloud, an acro & contemporary dancer from Westfield, Massachusetts. She was brought on the show to rival Kalani. She was on the show until the end of season 4, when the ensemble team disbanded and she was dismissed. Jade is the first Native American dancer to be featured at ALDC and on Dance Moms.
- Ava Cota, a lyrical & contemporary dancer from Fenton, Michigan. She was brought on the team to rival Kendall. She danced with the team until she was kicked off by Abby on episode 26. After being kicked off the team, Ava competed with her mother's studio, JC's Broadway Dance Academy. She also competed as part of the Candy Apple's Dance Center for part of fifth and seventh seasons.
- Sarah Hunt, a lyrical & contemporary dancer from Pittsburgh. She was brought on the team to rival Mackenzie. She danced with the team for a week and was kicked off due to her mother's behavior. Afterwards, Sarah was trying to join both the Junior Elite and the ensemble teams, only for her mother's behavior getting her kicked off once again. After season 4, Sarah made an appearance in seasons 5 & 6. She has not been featured on the show again since.
- Sarah Reasons, an acro & lyrical dancer from Queen Creek, Arizona. She was brought on the team to rival Nia. She was on the team until the end of season 4, when the ensemble team disbanded and she was dismissed. After the disbandment of the ensemble team, Sarah made an appearance in season 5. She has not been featured on the show again since.

=== Junior Select Ensemble Team Moms ===
- Tami Adamson, mother of Tea.
- Jodi Gray, mother of Kamryn.
- Loree Cloud, mother of Jade. Like Abby, she is a dance teacher and the owner of New England Dance and Gymnastic Centers. Prior to the show, Loree had been a longtime friend of Abby.
- Jeanette Cota, mother of Ava. Formerly a model, she is the former owner of JC's Broadway Dance Academy (BDA), which was located in Fenton. Jeanette closed the BDA permanently in 2017.
- Christy Hunt, mother of Sarah H. She was not liked by the other moms on the show due to her aggressive behavior.
- Tracey Reasons, mother of Sarah R.

== Cast duration ==
Dancer/Dance Mom	Episodes																															
Dancer/Dance Mom	1	2	3	4	5	6	7	8	9	10	11	12	13	14	15	16	17	18	19	20	21	22	23	24	25	26	27	28	29	30	31	32
Brooke																																
Chloe																																
Kalani																																
Kendall																																
Mackenzie																																
Maddie																																
Nia																																
Paige																																
Christi																																
Holly																																
Jill																																
Kelly																																
Kira																																
Melissa																																

=== Notes ===
Key: = featured in this episode
Key: = not featured in this episode
Key: = joins the Abby Lee Dance Company
Key: = leaves the Abby Lee Dance Company
Key: = leaves the show entirely
Key: = leaves the Abby Lee Dance Company and the show entirely

== Episodes ==
No. overall	No. in season	Title	Original release date	US viewers (millions)
TBA	-	"Guess Who's Coming to the Dance?"	January 1, 2014	1.59
The mothers talk about the previous season and what to expect for Season 4. Hosted by executive producer Jeff Collins.
84	1	"Welcome Back...Now Don't Get Too Comfy"	January 1, 2014	2.42
It is the start of the new competition season, and all the girls have returned, including Chloe and Payton. The girls rehearse a jazz number reflecting the mothers' behavior during nationals, in which Chloe and Payton are featured. Meanwhile, Brooke is invited to sing at a concert by country singer Jana Kramer and the girls are invited to watch her perform, which means they all get to leave rehearsal early. Abby feels this event contributed to their "poor" performance. Additionally, Jill feels Kendall is being punished after Nia is assigned a solo.
85	2	"Two Can Play This Game"	January 7, 2014	2.17
Abby states that Maddie is irreplaceable, and is looking for her number two dancer in either Chloe or Kendall. The mothers are concerned that Kendall has a leg up after discovering that Jill brought in Kendall for a private session, although Jill denies any knowing of an upcoming solo. Meanwhile, Cathy considers a lyrical group routine despite not teaching lyrical at her studio. Additionally, Leslie's sudden tears challenges Payton's position on the team.
86	-	"Dance Moms Cares"	January 14, 2014	1.21
In this special filmed at the end of last year, the ALDC shows there is no downtime even in the off season. Abby enters her girls in a big Atlantic City dance competition that benefits the fight against cancer. All the moms are on edge as it's the first time the team is competing since the blow up at Nationals. Meanwhile, cancer hits close to home while Abby deals with her own mother's fight with the disease.
87	3	"Abby Strikes Back"	January 14, 2014	2.00
Jill thinks Christi is behind the supposed fiasco during last week's competition. Brooke is assigned a featured spot in the trio, and Jill thinks Kendall should've gotten the spot mirroring Paige. Abby is concerned that Jill is hindering Kendall's drive and challenging her position on the team. Meanwhile, Abby hosts the first audition on her three-stop casting tour in Orlando, Florida, much to the dismay of the mothers. Additionally, Payton gets injured backstage at competition.
88	4	"Chloe vs. Kendall: Round 2"	January 21, 2014	2.01
Chloe and Kendall, again, are assigned to go head-to-head at the upcoming competition. Jill and Christi hope for a level playing field for the girls as they rehearse their solos at the same time. Meanwhile, Abby discovers that the Candy Apples' team is all boys, and is concerned about the strength of her girls. The girls rehearse a group routine entitled "Witches of East Canton", reflecting the rivalry between Abby and Cathy. Additionally, Payton is removed from competing because of her injury.
89	5	"No One Is Safe"	January 28, 2014	2.41
Abby thinks that dance is a part of life, and says that the girls would benefit from homeschooling to spend more time at the studio. Melissa reveals that Maddie and Mackenzie have been taking more privates, and Abby assigns them solos that are out of their comfort zone. Meanwhile, Nia is given the featured role in a controversial group routine, and Holly fears Nia's position on the team if the dance places poorly. Additionally, Abby hosts the second audition on her three-stop casting tour.
90	6	"Clash of the Chloes"	February 4, 2014	2.02
During pyramid, Abby introduces a new dancer aptly named Chloe, and both Chloes are assigned solos for the upcoming competition. "New Chloe" struggles under Abby's tutelage, and her mother is overconfident about her daughter's abilities. At competition, Abby hopes for "new Chloe" to prove herself, but her mother challenges her position on the team. Meanwhile, Nia is placed at the top of the pyramid but is relegated to a duet with Kendall that is under-rehearsed.
91	7	"Big Trouble in the Big Apple"	February 11, 2014	2.51
The ALDC is invited to participate in a competition in Pittsburgh in addition to the Elite Team competing in New York. Abby has only some of her team members dancing in Pittsburgh, which rests the competition on Chloe, Brooke, and Paige. Christi and Kelly are happy to see their daughters doing extra dances, but tension arises when they learn that Abby enters Maddie's duet with Kalani (from Abby's Ultimate Dance Competition) to compete against Chloe and Paige. Abby brings Kalani and her mother, Kira, into the dressing room, which leads to a physical fight between Abby and Kelly. Additionally, Abby hosts the third audition on her three-stop casting tour. Note: Kelly leaves the ALDC. Brooke and Paige officially leave the ALDC and the series.
92	8	"Wingman Down"	February 18, 2014	2.01
Abby reveals that Brooke and Paige are no longer on the team. New dancer Kalani is introduced after her winning duet with Maddie last week, and now has a duet with Kendall. Maddie and Chloe are also given a duet, but their friendship is strained due to the events last week. Nia is assigned a solo that is under-rehearsed and has a wardrobe malfunction on stage. Meanwhile, Christi distances herself from the other mothers because her wingman Kelly is no longer at the ALDC. Additionally, Mackenzie takes extra voice lessons. Note: Kira and Kalani join the ALDC.
93	9	"Nothing's Fair in Abbyville"	February 25, 2014	2.06
Maddie is absent from pyramid, and Kendall is voted as her replacement. Jill hopes for the featured role in the group dance, but learns that Kendall is simply selected as team captain when Maddie returns to rehearsals. At competition, Abby continues to find the best for her team, and puts Chloe and Kalani head-to-head in an effort to prove themselves. Meanwhile, Abby discovers that the mothers met with Kelly for lunch and again threatens them with expulsion. Additionally, Abby ups the difficulty in Mackenzie's performance. Note: Kelly leaves the series entirely.
94	10	"No Solo for You"	March 4, 2014	2.03
Kalani is put at the top of the pyramid, but Maddie is assigned a solo. Kira begs for the pair to dance against each other, but the second solo is assigned to Kendall. The mothers agree that Abby will not ever have Kalani and Maddie dance against each other in an effort to protect Maddie's awarded reputation, but when Kendall struggles through rehearsals, Kira pressures Abby for a solo for Kalani, but fails. At competition, the girls enter the dance improv contest, and Kira hopes Kalani can prove to Abby that she's a winner.
95	11	"Blame It on the New Girl"	March 11, 2014	2.19
Kendall is placed at the bottom of the pyramid for her "poor" placing solo at last week's competition, but is given a second chance in an effort to prove herself. Kira and Kalani are not at this week's competition as Kalani is attending NUVO Dance Competition in Long Beach, California with her home studio, so Abby brings in a new dancer Fallon, and her mother Cheryl, who struggle to keep up with the pace of the ALDC. Meanwhile, Cathy readies the Candy Apples to compete against the ALDC for the second time this season, but fears not being up to par after seeing the quality of Abby's group routine.
96	12	"Sister Showdown"	March 18, 2014	1.94
Chloe, Maddie, and Mackenzie are all vying for the overall top solo award. Abby tells Chloe she has an advantage as a contemporary dancer typically earns first place, but the mothers bicker about Maddie and Mackenzie getting more attention from Abby. Meanwhile, Payton has recovered from injury and is back with the team this week. Abby rehearses a group routine inspired by Kinky Boots, and has given Payton the featured role, but fears a loss without Maddie in the middle. Meanwhile, Christi considers homeschool for Chloe.
97	13	"Decisions Decisions"	March 25, 2014	1.99
Kira and Kalani are introduced to the team as permanent members of the ALDC Elite Competition Team. Leslie is still upset that Payton continues to be used as a swing and complains that Kalani took her spot on the team. Abby rehearses a group routine that requires costumes the girls already own, and scrounges for new outfits for Kalani and Payton to wear, but when Payton complains of hers being too small, Leslie complains of being set up and is asked to leave. Meanwhile, Cathy hopes for a win competing in her home town.
98	14	"Family Comes First"	April 1, 2014	1.99
The girls vie for another win, and Abby hopes a group routine inspired by Bollywood musicals will earn them a win. Nia has been struggling to place with her solo performances, and is pulled from the group routine for more time to rehearse another solo this week. With her mother's health declining, Abby spends time away from the studio to be with her and leaves Gianna to coach this week's competition without her. Additionally, Mackenzie hosts auditions for background dancers for her upcoming music video.
99	15	"Lights! Camera! Dance!"	April 8, 2014	1.75
Melissa takes control during Mackenzie's music video shoot, but the power quickly goes to her head. After racking up thirteen wins in a row, the pressure is on the Abby Lee Dance Company to continue their stellar winning streak. All the dances this week are in tribute to Abby's ailing mother and emotions are high. Note: This episode is dedicated to Maryen Lorrain Miller. (August 6, 1927 – February 8, 2014)
100	16	"Presenting My New Team"	April 15, 2014	2.00
Abby introduces her team of new dancers selected from her casting tour, and to everyone's surprise, Abby has also selected Maddie to join them. Abby rehearses a lyrical group routine with the new team, and the original mothers fear their group routine is under-rehearsed. Meanwhile, Melissa struggles to teach the new mothers about speaking their mind, and fails when Abby pulls one of the new dancers from the group routine. At competition, Abby hopes the original team can win without Maddie, but also prays for a clean sweep.
101	17	"Seeing Red"	April 22, 2014	1.63
Abby Lee Miller and the mothers recap the happenings of Season 4 thus far. Hosted by executive producer Jeff Collins.
102	18	"Girl Talk"	April 29, 2014	1.31
The girls talk about their lives as dancers and being in the spotlight. Hosted by executive producer Jeff Collins.
103	19	"The Battle of Maddie vs. Chloe"	May 13, 2014	0.87
A clip show based on the beginnings of the "rivalry" between Maddie and Chloe. Hosted by executive producer Jeff Collins.
104	20	"Abby's Top Ten Dances"	June 24, 2014	1.44
A clip show consisting of the Top 10 dances performed on Dance Moms. Hosted by Abby Lee Miller.
105	21	"Double the Moms, Double the Trouble"	July 29, 2014	1.44
Abby learns that Kira took Kalani back home, and has asked Maddie to dance with the original team this week forcing the new team to prove themselves without her. Meanwhile, the mothers struggle to bond, especially with new mom, Christy, who feels she earned her spot being a paying customer of Abby's. At competition, the mothers sense that Abby is spending more time with the new team and fear a loss against a team of older dancers with more challenging choreography. Note: Kira and Kalani leave the ALDC.
106	22	"Kiss or Get Off the Pot"	August 5, 2014	1.52
The Select Ensemble is given the week off, and Abby has asked Christy's daughter, Sarah, to perform with the Elite Team. Unfortunately, Sarah struggles with the choreography, but Christy is still confident with her daughter's position on the team. Meanwhile, Abby has invited a male dancer to perform with Maddie in her first duet, but Maddie turns shy when they are directed to kiss on stage. Additionally, the Candy Apples ready for another competition, and Cathy uses a choreographer familiar with Abby, who fears another loss. The CADC duet wins first place while Maddie and Gino are second.
107	23	"Three Soloists, One Star"	August 12, 2014	1.71
Maddie is absent from pyramid, and Abby assigns Kendall the lead role in the group routine. When Maddie returns to rehearsals, she is given the task of helping choreograph, which upsets the mothers. Meanwhile, the Select Ensemble is still on hiatus, and Sarah, again, is invited to perform with the Elite Team this week. Unfortunately for Sarah, Christy's behavior gets her daughter pulled from the competition. At competition, Kendall, Nia, and Chloe are each assigned solo performances, and Abby hopes for a clean sweep.
108	24	"Abby-phobic"	August 19, 2014	1.67
Abby has invited Jade from the Select Ensemble to dance with the Elite Team this week and has assigned her to go head-to-head against Chloe at competition. Meanwhile, Abby has discovered that Studio Bleu is scheduled to compete this week, and feels that the group routine isn't competitive enough. For competition, Abby pulls Mackenzie from the group routine and has the girls compete in a higher age division to avoid a loss. Additionally, Jade's mother, Loree, a fellow dance instructor, feels uncomfortable around Abby.
109	25	"Chloe Gets Revenge"	August 26, 2014	1.57
The Select Ensemble is back from hiatus, without Sarah H and Christy. Jade continues to perform with the Elite Team this week, but in order to have even numbers, Abby has selected Chloe to dance with the Select Ensemble, which concerns Christi. Meanwhile, Maddie is assigned a solo to go head-to-head against Ava, whose mother, Jeanette, feels that Abby isn't giving her daughter strong choreography. At competition, the Select Ensemble prove themselves, again, and Christi is prideful of Chloe's flexibility.
110	26	"No More Crybabies"	September 2, 2014	1.55
Abby has invited Tea and her mother, Tami, to travel with the Elite Team this week, and Gia has convinced Abby to allow Sarah H and her mother, Christy, to join them as well. With this, Abby has selected Tea, Sarah H, and Mackenzie to compete in the younger division to prove themselves before Nationals. Meanwhile, it is discovered that Ava is scheduled to compete with her home studio, and Abby has Maddie perform last minute in hopes of a winning number. Additionally, Nia is given the lead in group routine.
111	27	"The Understudies"	September 9, 2014	1.38
This week, Maddie is given a solo, even though she might be needed in Miami for a job on competition day. So Abby calls Kendall and Chloe to be Maddie's understudies in case she might not be able to perform. On a big, distracting board, the moms start counting the number of times Abby reprimands each girl as she praises Maddie to show Abby how harshly she behaves toward her dancers. The solo that Maddie, Chloe and Kendall are learning is to be performed against Gino who has rejoined Candy Apples. At competition, an argument between the moms and Abby about the board pushed the latter to cancel the group dance last minute to punish everybody for their parents behavior.
112	28	"Another One Bites the Dust"	September 16, 2014	1.48
Sarah R. and her mother, Tracy have been asked to join the Elite team. Kendall is given the same solo that Maddie performed last week and she's going against Nia and Sarah. The group dance is called "Seven Dancers", so Abby brings an additional dancer to the team. Nia wins first place and Kendall is second.
113	29	"45 Second Solos"	September 23, 2014	1.39
Abby's Annual Dance Concert is always bigger than any old recital and this year is no different, as the theme is an emotional tribute to her mother. With Nationals a few days away, Abby gives the girls 45 seconds to prove they each deserve a solo. When Abby has Kamryn dance in Chloe's place, Christi begins to fear the security of Chloe's position at Nationals.
114	30	"Hollywood Here We Come, Part 1"	September 30, 2014	1.42
While the ALDC is in Los Angeles to compete at Nationals, Abby makes a major announcement. Jeanette, stalks the team to LA and vows revenge against Abby. Cathy schemes to ruin Abby's west coast visit by challenging the ALDC to a dance off.
115	31	"Hollywood Here We Come, Part 2"	October 7, 2014	1.61
Nationals are a day away, and with all of the distractions of Hollywood, the moms worry Abby has not given enough attention to the routines. With Cathy using the song that made Maddie famous, Abby considers pulling an ALDC solo to let Maddie dance. Stakes have never been higher as Abby threatens to cut the losing team and Christi and Chloe make a heart-wrenching decision. Note: Christi and Chloe leave the ALDC.
116	32	"Playing Favorites"	October 14, 2014	1.46
The moms from both the Elite and Select Teams face off against Abby to hash out their grudges from this season and accuse her of blatant favoritism. Maddie takes the stage to talk about her recent success in Hollywood with the Sia video, the girls present new dances, and of course, Cathy makes an appearance to ruffle Abby's feathers.

== Lawsuit ==
The episode "Big Trouble in the Big Apple" that aired on February 11, 2014 features the competition team at New York. During the final moments of the episode, Abby Lee Miller and dance mom Kelly Hyland get into a heated argument and Kelly ends up slapping Abby across the face and pulling her hair. Abby informs security and Kelly is removed from the building. Following the incident, Kelly filed a lawsuit against Abby for 5 million dollars, while Abby Lee Miller filed for assault against Hyland. Following the court proceedings, Hyland was banned from contacting Abby Lee Miller, including in forms of social media such as Twitter.
