= Dance Moms season 2 =

Dance Moms
- Season 2
- Dance Moms Season 2 DVD covers
- Starring: Abby Lee Miller; Gianna Martello; Melissa Gisoni; Maddie Ziegler; Mackenzie Ziegler; Christi Lukasiak; Chloe Lukasiak; Kelly Hyland; Brooke Hyland; Paige Hyland; Holly Hatcher-Frazier; Nia Sioux; Jill Vertes; Kendall Vertes
- No. of episodes: 28 and 2 specials

Release
- Original network: Lifetime
- Original release: January 10 – September 25, 2012

Season chronology
- ← Previous; Season 1 Next → Season 3

The second season of Dance Moms, an American dance reality television created by Collins Avenue Productions, began airing on January 10, 2012 on Lifetime's television network. The season concluded on September 25, 2012. A total of 28 official episodes and 2 special episodes (Abby's Most OMG Moments, Abby's Dance-A-Thon) aired this season.

== Overview ==
The second season Abby Lee Miller favorites Maddy Ziegler, Abby talks bad about all the dancers secretly off camera and then in season 2 episode 7 all the dancers bring in chainsaws and to prank Abby, all the Dance Moms take the chainsaws off the girls and comfort them. Then Kendal Vertes makes an appearance, her mom Jill talks about her smelly feet the whole season.

The second season featured thirteen star billing cast members with various other dancers and moms appearing throughout the season.

=== Dancers ===
- Maddie Ziegler
- Mackenzie Ziegler
- Chloe Lukasiak
- Nia Sioux
- Paige Hyland
- Brooke Hyland
- Kendall Vertes

=== Moms ===
- Melissa Gisoni
- Christi Lukasiak
- Holly Hatcher-Frazier
- Kelly Hyland
- Jill Vertes

=== Guest dancers ===
- Payton Ackerman
- Nicaya Wiley
- Nick Dobbs
- Auriel Welty
- Katherine Narasimhan
- Nina Linhart
- Vivi-Anne Stein (Candy Apples Team)
- Justice McCort (Candy Apples Team)
- Taylor O'Lear (Candy Apples Team)
- Erika Schrade (Candy Apples Team)
- Sarah Parish (Candy Apples Team)
- Kerisa McCullough (Candy Apples Team)

=== Guest moms ===
- Cathy Nesbitt-Stein (Candy Apples team)
- Leslie Ackerman
- Kaya Wiley

== Cast duration ==
Dancer/Dance Mom	Episodes																									
Dancer/Dance Mom	1	2	3	4	5	6	7	8	9	10	11	12	13	14	15	16	17	18	19	20	21	22	23	24	25	26
Brooke																										
Chloe																										
Kendall																										
Mackenzie																										
Maddie																										
Nia																										
Paige																										
Christi																										
Holly																										
Jill																										
Kelly																										
Melissa																										

=== Notes ===
Key: = featured in this episode
Key: = not featured in this episode
Key: = joins the Abby Lee Dance Company
Key: = leaves the Abby Lee Dance Company
Key: = returns to the Abby Lee Dance Company
Key: = leaves the Candy Apples

== Episodes ==
No. overall	No. in season	Title	Original release date	US viewers (millions)
14	1	"Everyone's Replaceable"	January 10, 2012	2.51
It is the start of the new competition season, and Vivi-Anne's position on the team is soon replaced by new dancer, Kendall. Payton, a Senior dancer, had also auditioned for the spot but is doted for being too tall, which upsets her mother, Leslie. Meanwhile, Kendall's mother, Jill, quickly befriends Melissa, whereas the other mothers are hesitant to accept her due to rumors of being a "studio hopper". Additionally, Mackenzie learns she has come of age to perform in the Elite Team's group routines. Note: Jill and Kendall join the ALDC.
15	2	"Return of the Candy Apples"	January 17, 2012	2.08
The ALDC and Candy Apples Dance Center are to perform at the upcoming competition for the first time this season. Abby rehearses a group routine entitled "Bad Apples" reflecting Abby's relationship with Cathy. Brooke is given a solo to compete in the Junior Division and is scheduled to compete head-to-head against one of the Candy Apples' dancers. At competition, both Brooke and a Candy Apples' dancer are questioned for age discrepancy.
16	3	"Brooke's Turning Point"	January 24, 2012	2.50
Brooke is to be a role model for the younger dancers, but would like a change of pace and tries out for cheerleading. Abby does not notice Brooke's absence until later, and almost pulls the group routine, which had Brooke perform the featured role. The mothers are on the fence about Kelly's decision to allow Brooke to leave mid-season, and an angered Abby attends competition without Kelly. Meanwhile, the Candy Apples ready a group routine using Vivi-Anne to lower the median age.
17	4	"No One Likes a Bully"	January 31, 2012	1.98
With Brooke off the team, Abby brings in Payton, to replace her, which worries Jill about Kendall's position on the team. Abby rehearses a new group routine, and gives Nia the featured role. Holly objects to Nia's character and the role is given to Payton. At competition, Payton makes rude comments backstage, which challenges her position on the team. Meanwhile, a disheartened Paige is replaced by Kendall in the trio with Chloe and Maddie, with whom Paige has danced with since they were four years old.
18	5	"Brooke's Back" "Burn, Pom Poms, Burn!"	February 7, 2012	2.26
Brooke tires of cheerleading and has a heart-to-heart with Abby about returning to dance. At pyramid, it appears that Payton would be at the top, but Brooke's return places her there, and Abby informs Brooke that she has to win her division in order to stay. Meanwhile, Chloe is given the featured role in the group dance, and Jill is upset that the role was not given to Kendall. In an effort to get on Abby's good graces, Jill schedules a masseur to come to the studio for Abby.
19	6	"Jill on the Rampage" "Wardrobe Malfunction" or "The Dance Detectives"	February 14, 2012	2.27
When the competition is suddenly cancelled, Abby scrambles to find a new one. Meanwhile, Mackenzie is placed at the top of the pyramid for the first time after her big win at last week's competition. This week, the girls are each assigned a solo and the mothers are asked to design their own costume, and Abby is livid to discover that Jill purchased one for Kendall. At competition, Maddie falls during her routine and is escorted off stage. Additionally, Payton is spotted at the CADC open-call auditions.
20	7	"Bullets and Ballet" "Flash Dance Moms"	February 21, 2012	2.49
Based on last week's standings, Paige is finally at the top of the pyramid and Maddie is at the bottom. Paige runs out of rehearsal crying, to which Jill cites as a way to get Kendall in the trio. At competition, Paige, Chloe, and Maddie perform as their award winning trio, and Jill is seen talking to members of her former studio saying that Kendall's abilities are not being well utilized. Meanwhile, Abby performs a group routine in which the girls use guns as props, which concerns the mothers.
21	8	"The Runaway Mom"	February 28, 2012	2.27
After being put back on probation, Jill sends Kendall to a studio where she would feel more appreciated: Candy Apples Dance Center. At competition, Abby is surprised to find Kendall dancing with the Candy Apples, and Nia worries that they will compete head-to-head. The ALDC performs a wedding themed group routine reflecting Melissa's talked-about secret, whereas the Candy Apples perform a funeral themed routine. Additionally, Kendall performs a solo using Abby's choreography. Note: Jill and Kendall leave the ALDC and join the Candy Apples.
22	9	"Costume Drama" "Topless Showgirls"	March 6, 2012	2.70
Abby rehearses a group routine that involves the girls using large feathers as props. The mothers are outraged when they discover that the costumes for the dance make the girls appear nude on stage. Meanwhile, Abby is infuriated after learning that Chloe missed rehearsal to appear in a commercial for Cathy's husband's business. At competition, the mothers throw a surprise engagement party for Melissa, and Holly leads the girls out when a stripper arrives. Note: Due to negative critical response regarding the subject matter, this episode has been removed from rotation.
23	10	"Miami Heat Wave"	March 13, 2012	2.20
Abby rehearses a beach themed group routine, which excites the girls. Paige is scheduled to go to the doctor to have her plantar warts removed, but is worried about her spot in the trio because of the pain. Nia, also, is absent from rehearsal and is concerned for her solo being under-rehearsed. At competition, Nia forgets her solo and rushes off stage, but is given a second chance. Meanwhile, Cathy schedules a special performance for Kendall at a Harlem Globetrotters exhibition.
24	11	"Melissa Pleads the Fifth"	March 20, 2012	2.35
Melissa is frustrated that the other mothers continue to ask her about her pending nuptials and has her lawyer pen a letter telling them to back off. The mothers appear disgusted by it, and when confronted, Melissa tells Abby she selects to stay home this weekend, which upsets Maddie. Meanwhile, Nia is placed in the trio, and Abby gives her tips on how to recover when she forgets part of the routine on stage. At competition, a Candy Apples dancer falls on-stage and has to be rushed to the hospital.
25	12	"Waiting for Joffrey"	March 27, 2012	2.38
Abby learns of an upcoming Joffrey Ballet School Summer Intensive audition, and awaits the ALDC's invitation. Nia twists her ankle during rehearsal, but is concerned about the pain. Meanwhile, after overhearing the mothers' chatter, Abby rehearses a group routine reflecting the subject matter of her newfound secret. At competition, when the group routine does not place, Abby fears the ALDC will not be picked to audition. Additionally, Abby wants Nia to learn from Chloe's on-stage mishap.
26	13	"Abbygeddon"	April 3, 2012	2.61
The ALDC is in New York City preparing to audition for Joffrey Ballet School, and not far behind them are the Candy Apples. Meanwhile, Kendall is scheduled to go head-to-head against Maddie and Chloe at competition. Sadly, Maddie forgets her routine and runs off stage, begging for a second chance, but is disqualified. Abby shows emotion for Maddie's onstage mishap, and when the mothers confront Abby about not feeling hurt about the other girls, Abby leaves the mothers behind.
27	-	"Abby's Most OMG Moments"	June 5, 2012	1.48
Abby Lee Miller hosts a clip show featuring the most shocking moments so far on Dance Moms. This special episode was not given a number by Lifetime.
28	14	"The Battle Begins"	June 5, 2012	2.10
Maddie is only allowed to perform in this week's group routine after running off stage at last week's competition. Chloe finds herself at the top of the pyramid for the first time this season, and is given a copious amount of dances to learn. When Abby asks the girls to critique each other's dancing, Chloe feels stressed and leaves rehearsal. At competition, Maddie still refuses to dance her solo despite being listed as performing. Meanwhile, the mothers begin to lose trust in Abby's choreography, calling it stale.
29	15	"Night of the Living Dancers"	June 12, 2012	2.02
A saddened Maddie appears on the bottom of the pyramid for the first time based on her behavior last week. Although fearing under-confidence, Maddie says she's ready to dance her solo this week. At competition, Maddie dances to a scratched CD and the mothers question if she expected the music to be ruined. Meanwhile, Holly is given the difficult task of creating zombie-inspired costumes for the group routine. Additionally, Kelly's behavior forces Abby to pull both Paige's and Brooke's solos.
30	16	"I Know What You Did Last Competition"	June 19, 2012	1.84
The girls rehearse a group routine in which they use a large prop. When the girls complain about its weight, the prop gets switched for a lighter one that does not show well on stage. While preparing costumes for the dance, the girls are asked to switch outfits with each other despite their size differences. Meanwhile, based on Kelly's previous behavior, Abby explains how she could have had the girls expelled. Additionally, Mackenzie's solo finishes first place and earns her her first title award.
31	17	"Maddie Has a Secret"	June 26, 2012	2.12
Brooke is excused from competing this weekend, and Payton is used as her swing in the group routine. In the mezzanine, the mothers confront Leslie about Payton's supposed meanness toward the younger dancers. In an ironic twist, Payton is given the featured role in the group routine portraying a huntress. Meanwhile, Abby tells Melissa sneak away from the competition after her solo for Maddie to compete down the road from the ALDC, hoping to continue building her confidence if she wins in both contests.
32	-	"Abby's Dance-a-Thon"	July 3, 2012	1.99
Abby Lee Miller hosts a clip show featuring twenty previous performances ranked from worst to best. This episode was not given a number by Lifetime.
33	18	"How Do You Like Them Apples?"	July 10, 2012	2.08
Abby eagerly wants to defeat the Candy Apples after a humiliating loss when they last competed against each other. Abby invites three Senior dances to join this week's group routine, and bumps up the choreography. Meanwhile, Kelly is concerned that Paige's solo routine is unchallenging and selects to re-choreograph the dance for her, which upsets Abby. Additionally, Cathy has hires two new choreographers to help with the Candy Apples' and produce a solo for Kendall, which Jill feels is poorly rehearsed. Note: Jill and Kendall leave the Candy Apples.
34	19	"Worst Birthday Party Ever!"	July 17, 2012	1.92
Payton is invited to dance in this week's group routine to replace Mackenzie due to the dance's sensitive theme. Chloe secretly misses rehearsal after Christi allows her to attend an overnight school trip. Leslie uses her absence as a chance for Payton to learn a new solo, but Payton feels under-rehearsed at competition. Meanwhile, the ALDC and the Candy Apples audition for a small role on Drop Dead Diva. Additionally, a fight between the mothers breaks out during Kelly's birthday celebration.
35	20	"Guess Who's Back?"	July 24, 2012	2.12
Everyone is stunned to see Jill and Kendall walk in during pyramid, and Kendall is quickly placed on probation. Abby announces she has invited a Senior male dancer to perform in the group routine, which the girls seem excited about. At competition, an argument ensues after Abby finds Jill tying a ribbon in Kendall's hair. Meanwhile, Maddie learns she earned the coveted role on Drop Dead Diva. Additionally, Paige gets seriously injured backstage. Note: Jill and Kendall come back to the ALDC.
36	21	"Break a Leg"	August 7, 2012	2.16
Paige learns she is out for six weeks due to a broken foot, and Jill seizes the opportunity to get Kendall in the strongly requested duet with Chloe. With one child already injured, bad news is compounded with Kelly learns of Brooke's sudden back pain. Brooke selects to pull her solo routine, which upsets Abby. Meanwhile, Maddie has to deal with packed schedule having the featured role in the group routine, learning a new solo, and leaving to film Drop Dead Diva.
37	22	"Revenge of the Candy Apples"	August 14, 2012	2.08
Cathy finally discovers that Jill has returned to the ALDC, and plots her revenge at the upcoming competition. When Abby learns about the Candy Apple's last minute sign-up, Abby asks Maddie to learn a solo the day prior, but Melissa says "no", leaving Chloe to defend the ALDC. Meanwhile, Abby rehearses a new group routine, and Maddie, again, gets the featured role. The mothers are concerned about dance's theme, and Melissa gets criticized about favoritism between the girls.
38	23	"The Recital to End All Recitals"	August 21, 2012	2.39
This week is the ALDC annual recital, and Abby is very stressed. The girls rehearse a new group routine to a genre they feel uncomfortable in, only to allow Paige to perform without putting much weight on her injured foot. Jill invites the Candy Apples to the recital to show off what Kendall has been learning, but Cathy uses her attendance as an opportunity to scout new dancers. Meanwhile, Abby is intrigued when a new mother, Kaya, asks for an audition for her daughter, Nicaya.
39	24	"New Girl in Town" "One Danced Over the Cuckoo's Nest"	August 28, 2012	2.24
Abby's new dancer, Nicaya, is not very knowledgeable of her dance terminology, and is unsure if either she or Paige should perform in the group routine, despite Paige being cleared to dance by her doctor. At competition, both girls perform, to criticism from Abby. Backstage, the mothers band together in an effort to nag Kaya, but after a verbal altercation, Abby asks Kaya to leave citing disrespect and boisterous behavior, and scolds the mothers for driving away another dancer.
40	25	"Solo Fever"	September 4, 2012	2.30
There is only one week left, and each girl must prove herself if she wants to dance at Nationals. Abby assigns each girl a solo, except Maddie. Later, a saddened Maddie asks if she dance, and Abby gives in. Meanwhile, Kelly takes Brooke to a recording studio, and has asked the other girls to sing back up, and allows Abby to produce her music video. Additionally, Paige is worried about her simplified solo as Abby is unsure about her development from injury.
41	26	"Nationals 90210"	September 11, 2012	2.10
The pressure is on to see who gets to dance at Nationals this weekend. Abby rehearses a group routine of a serious nature entitled "The Last Text", and the mothers are concerned about the dance's mature theme. Meanwhile, the Candy Apples are readying for the National competition, and Cathy has produced a dance to go head-to-head against both Maddie and Chloe. At competition, the ALDC pulls a clean sweep with Chloe earning a title award, as do Mackenzie and Brooke.
42	27	"Reunion: Off the Dance Floor, Part 1"	September 18, 2012	1.72
The moms, Abby, and Cathy sit down and talk about the happenings of Season 1 and 2. Hosted by executive producer Jeff Collins.
43	28	"Reunion: Off the Dance Floor, Part 2"	September 25, 2012	1.47
The moms, Abby, and Cathy sit down and talk more about the happenings of seasons 1 and 2. Hosted by executive producer Jeff Collins.
