= Dance Moms season 6 =

Dance Moms
- Season 6
- Season 6 promotional poster
- Starring: Abby Lee Miller; Gianna Martello; Melissa Gisoni; Maddie Ziegler; Mackenzie Ziegler; Holly Hatcher-Frazier; Nia Sioux; Jill Vertes; Kendall Vertes; Kira Girard; Kalani Hilliker; Jessalynn Siwa; JoJo Siwa; Ashlee Allen; Brynn Rumfallo
- No. of episodes: 33 and 1 special

Release
- Original network: Lifetime
- Original release: January 5 – November 22, 2016

Season chronology
- ← Previous; Season 5 Next → Season 7

The sixth season of Dance Moms, an American dance reality television created by Collins Avenue Productions, began airing on January 5, 2016, on Lifetime's television network. The season concluded on November 22, 2016. A total of 33 official episodes and one special episode aired this season.

== Cast ==
=== Choreographers and Instructors ===
- Abby Lee Miller
- Gianna Martello
- Debbie Allen
- Erin Babbs
- Guy Amir
- Nakul Dev Mahajan
- Rumer Noel
- Jeanette Cota
- Miranda Maleski
- Daniel Jaber

=== Junior Elite Team ===
- Maddie Ziegler
- Mackenzie Ziegler
- Nia Sioux
- Kendall Vertes
- JoJo Siwa
- Brynn Rumfallo
- Kalani Hilliker

=== Junior Elite Team Moms ===
- Melissa Gisoni
- Holly Frazier
- Jill Vertes
- Jessalynn Siwa
- Ashlee Allen
- Kira Girard

=== Mini Team Dancers ===
- Peyton Evans
- Areana Lopez
- Alexus Oladi
- Alysa Owen
- Kendyl Fay
- Lilliana Ketchman
- Elliana Walmsley

=== Mini Team Moms ===
- Kerri Evans
- Sari Lopez
- Tiffanie Oladi
- Mary Owen
- Lynn Fay
- Stacey Ketchman
- Yolanda Walmsley

=== Guest Moms/Dancers ===
- Sarah Hunt (Guest Dancer)
- Christy Hunt (Guest Mom)
- Kendyl Fay (Guest Dancer)
- Lynn Fay (Guest Mom)
- Alysa Owen (Guest Dancer)
- Mary Owen (Guest Mom)
- Kaylee Quinn (Guest Dancer)
- Coco Quinn (Guest Dancer)
- Rihanna Quinn (Guest Dancer)
- Jeannie Quinn (Guest Mom)

== Cast duration ==
Dancer/Dance Mom	Episodes																												
Dancer/Dance Mom	1	2	3	4	5	6	7	8	9	10	11	12	13	14	15	16	17	18	19	20	21	22	23	24	25	26	27	28	29
Maddie																													
Mackenzie																													
Nia																													
Kendall																													
Kalani																													
JoJo																													
Brynn																													
Elliana																													
Lilliana																													
Melissa																													
Holly																													
Jill																													
Kira																													
Jessalynn																													
Ashlee																													
Yolanda																													
Stacey																													

=== Notes ===
Key: = featured in this episode
Key: = not featured in this episode
Key: = joins the Abby Lee Dance Company
Key: = returns to the Abby Lee Dance Company
Key: = leaves the Abby Lee Dance Company
Key: = leaves the Abby Lee Dance Company and the show entirely

== Episodes ==
No. overall	No. in season	Title	Original release date	US viewers (millions)
151	-	"No Moms Allowed"	January 5, 2016	1.08
Leading up to the premiere of Dance Moms, the special will be bigger and more fun than ever! The girls will dish about all of the drama from the past season, what's to come for the ALDC and answer fans' biggest questions. The girls will also perform a fan-favorite routine and Nia will sing her song "Slay."
152	1	"New Season, New Rules"	January 5, 2016	1.37
It’s the ALDC’s first week of the competition season and Abby starts it off with a bang—a big announcement that will change the future of the team. Maddie’s star is glowing brightly as she shoots her first movie and her new substitute on the team, Brynn, is a slap in the face to Jill and Kendall. Meanwhile, Jeanette and her BDA team, the reigning National champs, are back and ready to show the ALDC how dancing is done. Note: Ashlee and Brynn return to the ALDC.
153	2	"Abby vs. Melissa"	January 12, 2016	1.26
The moms are shocked to learn that Abby is forming a new team, but they're even more surprised when news breaks that Abby could be facing jail time. When Mackenzie receives the brunt of Abby's rage, Melissa vows not to play nice anymore.
154	3	"Mini Dancers, Big Drama"	January 19, 2016	1.38
Abby's new mini team arrives at the ALDC LA and tensions are high. Distracted by new moms, new dancers, and her continuing legal troubles, Abby is hanging on by a thread, and everyone knows it. Meanwhile, Ashlee and Brynn are caught in Jill's crosshairs as Kendall's position on the Junior Competition team is threatened. A hip-hop group number pushes Abby’s team.
155	4	"Now You See Abby, Now You Don't"	January 26, 2016	1.34
It's a full house at the ALDC and the minis are set to compete with their first group dance. Maddie is back and books a prestigious photo shoot for Seventeen with Nia and Kendall. Meanwhile, Maddie and Brynn compete head to head with solo routines. With Maddie's busy schedule, Ashlee sees this as the opportunity for Brynn to steal the title of Abby's #1 dancer. Later, the chaos in the studio proves too much for Abby to handle and she makes a huge announcement that could tear the team apart.
156	5	"Abby's Replaceable"	February 2, 2016	1.47
After resigning the previous week, Abby locks the team out of her LA studio. Debbie Allen extends an invitation to the ALDC to work with her, proving that everyone is replaceable including Abby. Special guest choreographer Nakul includes the minis in a difficult Bollywood routine. Kalani and Nia are pushed to their breaking point with an inspired duet while mini Peyton and her mother Kerri struggle with the pressure of two dances. With no leader, the moms fear a disaster is inevitable.
157	6	"Abby's New Favorites"	February 9, 2016	1.41
Abby is back but her focus is only on the minis. With only four girls on the unofficial mini team, a new mini Kendyl, and her mother Lynn, show up to audition and they rub Melissa the wrong way. With the original junior team only competing in one routine, the moms complain when “Maddie’s replacement” Brynn is chosen to dance the lead role. With Maddie set to return for good next week, Brynn’s future at the ALDC depends on a win.
158	7	"Debbie Allen to the Rescue"	February 16, 2016	1.45
With the stress of Abby's legal woes looming overhead, she reaches her limit and kicks the girls out of her studio. The moms contact Debbie Allen, who graciously offers her studio so the girls can rehearse for their upcoming Arizona competition. Kira is finally back with the team and Ashlee is ready for a fight.
159	8	"Maddie Is Back"	February 23, 2016	1.32
Maddie returns from shooting her movie, but Abby does not seem happy to see her; the mothers wonder if Abby is jealous of Maddie's fame. Ashlee hopes that Abby will spend more time grooming Brynn to be the next big star, while Brynn is on probation for the week.
160	9	"Nia Saves the Day"	March 1, 2016	1.29
It's a week of duets for the ALDC junior elite team with Brynn and Maddie going up against Kalani and Kendall. But when Kalani's back injury starts to act up and Kira is not there to help, Melissa and the other moms have to step in and do what's right for her. Later, with Kira absent and the original moms distracted, Ashlee takes the opportunity to fill in for Abby's newly fired office manager causing more drama with the other moms.
161	10	"Abby Lee Horror Story"	March 8, 2016	1.21
The ALDC travels to Northern California and Abby's routines are darker than ever. The moms decide to pull a prank but it backfires horribly. Meanwhile, Maddie, Brynn and Kendall compete with solos and Ashlee will do anything to give Brynn an advantage, even if that means becoming Abby's employee.
162	11	"The Maddie Rumor"	March 15, 2016	1.25
Maddie is nominated for a People's Choice Award and the media is abuzz with rumors that she is leaving the ALDC. The moms are furious when Abby invites Brynn as her date to the People's Choice and the biggest moment of Maddie's professional career. The minis are back, along with a new mom, Jeannie, whose daughter, Kaylee's attitude causes a dance catastrophe.
163	12	"Brynn's Big Moment"	March 22, 2016	1.39
Abby brings in Todrick Hall to direct the girls in a big musical commercial inspired by The Wiz in an attempt to get new customers to sign up at the ALDC. Maddie and Brynn captain trio teams of their choosing that compete head to head. The pressure is on for Brynn as she will finally become an official member of the ALDC if her trio wins.
164	13	"ALDC Does Vegas"	March 29, 2016	1.51
Abby has prepared several show stopping numbers this week—including an unusual David Bowie tribute—and the ALDC is heading to Las Vegas. Ashlee and Brynn are now official members of the team, but the fighting hits its peak when Kendall stands up to Ashlee for the first time. The moms are concerned that the girls are becoming too involved in the drama, but are unsure things will ever get better.
165	14	"JoJo Steals the Show Show"	April 5, 2016	1.42
Abby welcomes back ALDC Pittsburgh veteran, Sarah H., to dance with the team. Tempers flare when her mother, Christy, calls Jessalynn’s loyalty into question. After Abby pulls Kendall and Maddie’s duet, Kendall has an emotional meltdown and Melissa seriously questions whether to keep Maddie on the team at all.
166	15	"Melissa's Announcement"	April 12, 2016	1.66
Abby's whole world is shattered when Melissa shares shocking news that she, Maddie, and Mackenzie are leaving the ALDC. But with the ALDC competing three duets and an epic group number inspired by the new blockbuster film, The Huntsman: Winter's War, there is little time to spend mending Abby's broken heart.
167	16	"Mack Z vs. Abby Lee"	April 19, 2016	1.40
It's hip-hop week, but not everyone is invited. Abby decides to give Brynn and JoJo hip-hop solos, but gives Mackenzie a safe acrobatic routine. With only two more weeks left on the team, Mackenzie fights for what she wants. Abby doesn't approve of Mackenzie's determination to dance hip-hop and flees the studio when the girls need her the most.
168	17	"Mini Madness"	April 26, 2016	1.27
Maddie and Brynn have solos this week, and the moms are not happy when Abby assigns Brynn a dance inspired by an old Maddie routine. The mini team returns to compete for Abby's attention. Note: Yolanda and Elliana join the ALDC.
169	18	"One Last Dance"	May 3, 2016	1.41
It’s one of the saddest weeks in ALDC history as Maddie and Mackenzie participate in their final competition with the team. The two sisters both have solos, but when Abby pits Mackenzie against a new mini, Areana, it’s clear that Abby is more concerned about her future than her past. The moms encourage Melissa to reason with Abby, since this is her last week, but she avoids the confrontation and takes her frustration out on the wrong person, ending her time with the ALDC like she never would have imagined. Note: Melissa, Maddie and Mackenzie leave the ALDC and the show entirely.
174	19	"Abby's New Beginning"	September 6, 2016	0.96
The season begins with a newly motivated Abby Lee promising to no longer overlook her remaining dancers now that her star, Maddie, is gone. Abby assigns Brynn and Kendall head-to-head duets with boy partners and Brynn struggles with the pressure. When Jessalynn calls out Abby's favoritism for Brynn, Ashlee reaches her boiling point.
175	20	"Nia & Kendall Face Off"	September 13, 2016	0.88
Abby challenges Nia and Kendall with tough head-to-head trios, but the group tribute to Madonna leaves the moms wanting more. Holly suspects Abby has a hidden agenda for Nia, but when she brings Nia's manager to the studio to investigate, her strategy backfires. When talk of the girls' technique erupts at competition, Abby abandons the team.
176	21	"Return of the Minis"	September 20, 2016	0.73
The minis are back for the first time this season and the elites question if Abby can hold true to her promise of new beginnings. Abby challenges the minis with a beauty pageant-themed dance where she will crown one mini queen of the routine. The elites perform a tribute to Prince, but feel the pressure to do him justice and fear they will fail to win with another tribute dance. To add to the chaos, Abby assigns two duets: JoJo and Brynn vs. Kendall and Nia. When Nia falls ill, Kendall is once again left without a partner. Note: Stacey and Lilliana join the ALDC.
177	22	"Mommy Meltdown"	September 27, 2016	0.81
It’s Mother’s Day and an emotional Abby tasks the minis with their first lyrical routine to honor her mother. The elites are put to the test when their moms make a shocking decision that leaves them without a group dance for competition. Tensions between the teams get physical and the moms give Abby an ultimatum.
178	23	"Mini Mayhem"	October 4, 2016	0.92
After last week’s fight between the elite and the mini moms, Abby attempts to unify the two teams by assigning the elites and minis duets as partners. With Abby’s continued favoritism toward the minis, the elites are once again forced to choreograph their own group dance. Both teams feel the pressure when Abby announces that the first solo of the season will be awarded to a dancer from the winning duet.
179	24	"Abby, You're Fired!"	October 11, 2016	0.89
Abby punishes the minis for their poor performance and awards the elites their first solos of the season. Jill infuriates Abby when she makes a major decision about Kendall’s music. No one feels safe when the media uncovers secrets from Kira’s past.
180	25	"JoJo is a No Show"	October 18, 2016	0.83
Kalani's friend who was a dancer in Arizona committed suicide, so the girls do a dance called "Suicide Hotline" to spread the word about teen suicide. Meanwhile, JoJo and Kendall are assigned a difficult ballet duet that tests JoJo beyond her limits, leading to the most dramatic turn of the season. Note: Jessalynn and JoJo officially leave the ALDC and the series. (Although the show made it look like JoJo left the show because of her duet, she actually left because of a contract she signed with Nickelodeon.)
181	26	"ALDC For Sale?"	October 25, 2016	0.78
Abby goes on the warpath after her trial hits the news again and a call from Debbie Allen has the moms speculating about the ALDC's future. Brynn is put to the test with her first solo of the season and the elites are tasked with one of their most challenging dances ever. However, the little bit of attention that Abby can muster goes to the minis.
182	27	"Float Like a Butterfly, Sting Like Ab-bee"	November 1, 2016	0.75
This week, all of the dances are a tribute to Muhammad Ali. Peyton and Lilliana from the mini team are given an acrobatic duet. The mini team have a lyrical routine where they will portray statues and two new dancers join the original team for a hip-hop group where they portray boxers in a ring. On top of all this, the original team take part in creating a commercial where they will dance whilst wearing the product being advertised. When the moms decide they don't like the group routine, they sneak the boys that danced in the commercial into the competition and rebel against Abby. The two new dancers have to then learn the commercial routine in an hour, and one of them doesn't make it onstage because of this. The group doesn't place and the elite team leave the ALDC as they believe Abby only wants the mini team. Note: Nia, Kendall, Kalani, and Brynn along with their moms Holly, Jill, Kira, and Ashlee leave the ALDC.
183	28	"Two Teams, Two Studios Part 1"	November 15, 2016	0.92
The elite team have abandoned Abby and hired rival choreographer, Erin Babbs, to choreograph the group routine as well as solos for Brynn, Kendall, and Kalani. Back at Abby's studio, the mini team are challenged with a difficult lyrical routine and Elliana, Alexus and Peyton are given solos. After Kerri strongly disapproves of her daughter's costume, Abby decides to pull Peyton's solo as well as removing her from the group dance.
184	29	"Two Teams, Two Studios Part 2"	November 22, 2016	0.81
When both teams arrive at competition, the two sets of mothers talk to each other and the mini mothers say that they will stick up for Peyton and Kerri if they face Abby's wrath. However, they don't stand up for the two which leads to Kerri taking Peyton to Erin's team. Peyton's costume is adjusted and she competed under Erin's name rather than Abby's. Kendall also decides to pull her own solo after her neck starts hurting severely. At the awards ceremony, Peyton places 2nd behind Elliana in the mini division, Brynn wins the preteen division and Kalani places 2nd in the teen division behind Daviana Fletcher (who joins the team in season 7). The mini group places 1st in the mini division and much to the disappointment of their mothers, the elite team place 3rd in the teen division. After the competition, the elite mothers get into a massive fight with Abby and they decide to go their own way without her.
