= Dance Moms season 5 =

Dance Moms
- Season 5
- Season 5 promotional poster
- Starring: Abby Lee Miller; Gianna Martello; Melissa Gisoni; Maddie Ziegler; Mackenzie Ziegler; Holly Hatcher-Frazier; Nia Sioux; Jill Vertes; Kendall Vertes; Kira Girard; Kalani Hilliker; Jessalynn Siwa; JoJo Siwa
- No. of episodes: 32 and 2 specials

Release
- Original network: Lifetime
- Original release: January 6 – August 18, 2015

Season chronology
- ← Previous; Season 4 Next → Season 6

The fifth season of Dance Moms, an American dance reality television created by Collins Avenue Productions, began airing on January 6, 2015, on Lifetime's television network. The season concluded on August 18, 2015. A total of 45 official episodes and 2 special episodes aired this season.

== Cast ==
The fifth season featured nine star billing cast members, with various other dancers and moms appearing throughout the season. This season is the first to feature JoJo Siwa and Brynn Rumfallo.

=== Choreographers and Instructors ===
- Abby Lee Miller
- Gianna Martello
- Cathy Nesbitt-Stein (Candy Apples Dance Center)
- Erin Rich-Stein (Candy Apples Dance Center)
- Molly Long (Dance Precisions Dance Studio)
- Erin Babbs (Murrieta Dance Project)
- Alexa Moffett (Club Dance Studio)
- Jeanette Cota (JC's Broadway Dance Academy)
- Chehon Wespi-Tschopp (Millennium Dance Complex)
- Travis Payne

=== Dancers ===
- Nia Sioux
- Kalani Hilliker
- JoJo Siwa
- Maddie Ziegler
- Mackenzie Ziegler
- Kendall Vertes

=== Moms ===
- Melissa Gisoni
- Holly Frazier
- Jill Vertes
- Kira Girard
- Jessalynn Siwa

=== Guest Dancers/Moms ===
- Sarah Hunt – ALDC Pittsburgh dancer (episode 3)
- Christy Hunt – ALDC Pittsburgh mom (episode 3)
- Sarah Reasons – former ALDC Junior Select Ensemble dancer (episodes 7 & 8)
- Tracey Reasons – former ALDC Junior Select Ensemble mom (episodes 7 & 8)
- Brynn Rumfallo – ALDC guest dancer (episodes 7–10)
- Ashlee Allen – ALDC guest mom (episodes 7–10)

=== Candy Apples Dance Center ===
(NOTE: The following pairs list the dancer first and the mom second. In Season 5 Episode 28, the competition team effectively disbanded, with its dancers reforming into Jeanette's BDA team.)

- Vivi-Anne Stein and Cathy Nesbitt-Stein
- Gavin, McKenzie, and Jo Anne Morales
- Lucas and Brigette Triana
- Ava and Jeanette Cota
- Haley and Melanie Huelsman
- Tessa and Renée Wilkinson
- Kaycee and Laura Rice

== Cast duration ==
Dancer/Dance Mom	Episodes																															
Dancer/Dance Mom	1	2	3	4	5	6	7	8	9	10	11	12	13	14	15	16	17	18	19	20	21	22	23	24	25	26	27	28	29	30	31	32
JoJo																																
Kalani																																
Kendall																																
Mackenzie																																
Maddie																																
Nia																																
Holly																																
Jessalynn																																
Jill																																
Kira																																
Melissa																																

=== Notes ===
Key: = featured in this episode
Key: = not featured in this episode
Key: = joins the Abby Lee Dance Company
Key: = returns to the Abby Lee Dance Company

== Episodes ==
No. overall	No. in season	Title	Original release date	US viewers (millions)
117	-	"Girl Talk 2"	January 6, 2015	1.42
Hosted by singer and actress Coco Jones, in this second installment of Girl Talk, the Dance Moms girls will answer their fans' questions, covering topics like boyfriends, rivalries...and Abby. We'll see clips of the girls' favorite dances over the years and even learn how to perform some of their signature moves.
118	1	"99 Problems But a Mom Ain't One"	January 6, 2015	1.82
The fifth season starts off in a rocky way because Chloe and Christi have disappeared from the team and have cut off all contacts between the girls and mothers. Abby announces that ALDC LA is happening and the team will be going to Los Angeles in a few weeks. She also calls Kalani and Kira back to the team to replace Chloe and Christi. Meanwhile, the moms are concerned about Paige's lawsuit against Abby and the negative social media comments from Abby's former team members. Note: Kira and Kalani come back to the ALDC.
119	2	"Abby Got Served"	January 13, 2015	1.55
Abby is shaken off by the visit of a court officer because of Paige's lawsuit. This week, the team is going to Detroit, where they'll encounter Ava and Jeanette. Maddie and Kalani are finally going up against each other as well as against Ava. Meanwhile, the girls are taking new headshots in order to prepare for LA, which leads to Holly and Jill clashing with Abby about her treatment towards Nia and Kendall.
120	3	"JoJo with a Bow Bow"	January 20, 2015	1.33
Maddie's got a job in LA and she won't be attending this week's competition. Abby invites Jessalynn and her daughter, JoJo, from Abby's Ultimate Dance Competition season 2 to replace Maddie. The negative vibe around the studio is not helping the moms being very welcoming. Abby and Holly are still mad at each other since last week's fight, and tensions are already growing with the Jessalynn. JoJo is given a lyrical solo intended to be Maddie's. However, Jojo is not able to perform it correctly so Abby changes it to a jazz routine. Since Abby's already entered the solo as a lyrical solo, she decides to give it to Sarah H., which brings back Christy. Note: Jessalynn and JoJo join the ALDC.
121	4	"Bye Bye Pittsburgh"	January 27, 2015	1.46
LA is only one week away, and JoJo and Jessalynn return to fight for a spot on the ALDC and are determined not to lose again. As the team prepares for their big Hollywood adventure, Holly and Jill grow concerned that Abby's focus will only be on her favorites and Nia and Kendall will be forgotten. After hearing about Maddie's next big Los Angeles opportunity, Holly and Jill vow to take matters into their own hands.
122	5	"Hello Hollywood, Goodbye Abby"	February 3, 2015	1.52
It's the first week in LA and the ALDC is about to go up against the Murrieta Dance Project. Abby doesn't consider Jojo as a team member, but still asks her to joins the team in LA. Abby is acting strange and she unexpectedly leaves Gianna in charge. Holly is appalled by Abby's behavior and wants to take charge over Nia's career, since Abby is not committed to do so.
123	6	"Nia Risks It All"	February 10, 2015	1.68
After a chaotic first week in Los Angeles, things do not settle down when Abby and Holly have their biggest and most shocking fight ever, causing Holly and Nia to skip two days of rehearsal to go to the recording studio with Aubrey O'Day. When they return, Nia is pulled out of the group routine. Meanwhile, Maddie prepares for another big Hollywood job, and all the girls soon are on edge when Abby announces an open call audition in Los Angeles. Holly and Nia grow especially fearful of their futures with the ALDC.
124	7	"Wild Wild West Coast, Part 1"	February 17, 2015	1.78
It's the ALDC's last week in LA and the moms' patience with Abby has grown thin due to the lack of opportunities for every girl except Abby's favorite. While Maddie is away, guest starring on TV's Austin & Ally, Abby brings in two swing dancers who not only take away her time and attention, but also threaten the girls' chance at their biggest audition to date, a music video for internet sensation and pop star MattyBRaps. Abby's job as a manager is put to the test when Mackenzie gets offered the lead.
125	8	"Wild Wild West Coast, Part 2"	February 24, 2015	1.67
The ALDC's last week in Los Angeles continues with the girls juggling a competition and a music video shoot with MattyB. When Abby can't see eye to eye with his manager, she tries to shut the video shoot down, driving a wedge between the moms who stay loyal to Abby (Melissa and Jill) and the moms who choose to stay at the shoot (Holly, Kira, and Jessalynn). Drama between Tracey and Kira backstage at the competition causes Abby to threaten Kalani and Sarah R.'s spots on the team. JoJo and Mackenzie's music stops while they are onstage. After none of the numbers win first overall, Abby pulls Sarah from the team.
126	9	"The Great Divide"	March 3, 2015	1.42
The ALDC is back in Pittsburgh, but there is still tension between the moms who stayed to film the MattyB music video and the moms who left. Abby creates a group dance reflecting the moms' behavior, while Nia, Kendall, and Kalani are assigned solos. The group falls into the teen category at this competition, so Abby pulls Kalani, and the group finally wins first overall again. After awards, the moms are angry that Abby allowed Kalani to accept the group award with the team even though she didn't dance in the number.
127	10	"The New Maddie?"	March 10, 2015	1.47
The ALDC girls are fresh off a big win and seem to be moving forward after their rocky journey to LA. That is, until Abby's nemesis, Cathy from the Candy Apples, returns with a surprise choreographer, Erin Babbs from the Murrieta Dance Project, who's sure to rattle the ALDC's confidence. Abby invites Ashlee and her daughter Brynn to come dance at the ALDC and quickly praises her as the next Maddie, which the original moms do not appreciate.
128	11	"Nia's Last Chance"	March 17, 2015	1.59
This week, the ALDC heads to Philadelphia with a risky non-lyrical routine. Nia, Maddie and Kendall are feeling the pressure with solos, and Nia is singled out with an ultimatum from Abby. Frustrated with the lack of support from Melissa and Jill and tired of being victimized by Abby, Holly makes friends with two unlikely allies, Kira and Jessalynn, which angers and alienates the original moms.
129	12	"Abby's Trash, Cathy's Treasure"	March 24, 2015	1.62
The media is going crazy for Maddie's second music video with Sia so Abby has all of the girls doing duets in her honor. Not everyone is a fan of Maddie's latest work, especially Cathy, who has assembled a new Candy Apple's team made up of dancers who have all worked with Abby and are ready to seek vengeance on the dance floor.
130	13	"Mackenzie's Time to Shine"	March 31, 2015	1.66
It's the last week before the ALDC tries to make another go of it in Los Angeles and Maddie is away again, this time dancing on Saturday Night Live. With her sister gone, Mackenzie has the chance to remind everyone she is more than just Maddie's little sister. Up against Cathy's new premium Candy Apple's team, Abby decides to push the envelope with a sassy and funky routine as Cathy is still reeling from their loss the week before.
131	14	"Hollywood, Round Two"	April 7, 2015	1.54
The ALDC is back in LA and it's time for the team to redeem itself by focusing on what made these girls stars in the first place: winning competitions! Holly and Jill don't see eye to eye when Abby decides to manage Kendall's new singing career. The pressure is on for Nia and Kendall as they both work to become pop stars while going head-to-head with solos this week. Not forgetting the constant fits of drama from Abby last time in Los Angeles, the girls give their all in the group dance in hopes of making their teacher proud.
132	15	"Maddie vs. Kalani"	April 14, 2015	1.42
Determined to have a victory in their first week back in Los Angeles, the ALDC faces the Murrieta Dance Project again, the team that won with a perfect score and sent Abby in a downward spiral of negativity. Putting her best foot forward, Abby gives solos to her two strongest dancers, Maddie and Kalani. Kalani is hungry for a win and she is feeling the pressure to beat not only Maddie, but the MDP as well. Sparks fly between Jill and Holly when Nia is left out of a showbiz opportunity, which puts a strain on the team as they try to master an edgy rose garden themed contemporary routine.
133	16	"Video Killed the ALDC Star"	April 21, 2015	1.69
It's the ALDC's last competition in LA, and JoJo and Kendall have challenging solos. To add to the pressure, Nia and Kendall are both shooting their music videos this week. While Holly and Jill initially remain supportive of each other's daughters as recording artists, their competitive sides get the best of them which results in an all-out war.
134	17	"Showdown in Pittsburgh, Part 1"	April 28, 2015	1.62
With the ALDC back in Pittsburgh to wrap up loose ends before they make the full-time move to LA, Abby has scheduled the team to attend both a competition and a convention. Adding to the pressure, two of Abby's biggest enemies, Cathy and Jeanette, will be at the competition and are confident they can win. Meanwhile, Holly has organized a premiere party for Nia's music video, but not everyone in the ALDC is excited about her big debut.
135	18	"Showdown in Pittsburgh, Part 2"	May 5, 2015	1.45
In their hometown of Pittsburgh, the ALDC embarks on their final competition before their big official move to Los Angeles. But when only Nia and JoJo show up to compete, chaos takes over and tempers flare. Cathy and Jeanette bring top notch routines to try and take the ALDC down, but without a full team, the threat from the ALDC's rivals takes a backseat to the risk of disqualification.
136	19	"Seeing Stars"	May 12, 2015	1.20
Abby and the dance moms get together to talk about the highs and lows of this season and try to hash out any remaining bad feelings. Holly and Abby go head to head once again, while Abby’s nemeses, Cathy and Jeanette, stir things up. Maddie talks about her newfound fame and upcoming events. On the verge of leaving for Australia and then Los Angeles for three months, the team reflects on all that they’ve learned, shared and lost during their time at the ALDC, and Abby reveals her plans for world domination.
137	20	"Dance Moms Down Under, Part 1"	May 19, 2015	0.94
The ALDC is headed to Australia to perform at the ASTRA Awards, but when Abby loses her passport, she leaves the entire team stranded in Sydney without her. Meanwhile, Jessalynn confronts the moms over a viral video of some of the girls making fun of JoJo. As Abby scrambles to replace her passport, Maddie is asked to go in her place to an interview, which causes her to miss a crucial rehearsal. Later, turmoil erupts at the ASTRA Awards.
138	21	"Dance Moms Down Under, Part 2"	May 26, 2015	1.10
Jealousy and competition threaten the ALDC as the team is divided into two parts when Abby excludes Nia and JoJo from the rest of the planned events in Australia. Kendall, Kalani, Maddie and Mackenzie have to learn a new routine to perform at a private fan event, while Holly brings in Mikey Minden to help Nia prepare to perform her single for the first time live. Holly makes it clear that, if the moms don’t show up for Nia’s performance, it could be the end of the ALDC as we know it.
139	22	"Live From LA, It's Kendall K"	June 9, 2015	1.12
ALDC LA is now a reality as the team finally makes its permanent move to Los Angeles. Kendall's video is set to premiere, but the pressure of her debut as a pop star coupled with a solo pushes her to the limit. Meanwhile, Abby makes a dramatic decision that the moms fear will jeopardize ALDC LA's first competition.
140	23	"Maddie vs. Mackenzie"	June 16, 2015	1.03
For the first time in years, Maddie and Mackenzie are competing with solos against each other in the same age category. The pressure is even higher for Maddie—who, in addition to practicing her risky tap solo, has a new video with Sia premiering this week. Abby brings in celebrity guest choreographer, Travis Payne, to teach the girls a routine inspired by voguing, a style with which they are unfamiliar. They have to not only impress Abby, but also this high-profile choreographer who is a power player in the dance industry.
141	24	"West Coast Strikes Back"	June 23, 2015	1.25
The ALDC's biggest west coast rival, MDP, is back and Abby wants to put her best foot forward at the competition. After Mackenzie's huge win against her big sister Maddie, Abby tests her confidence with a big opportunity. Will she be able to handle it? Meanwhile, JoJo's sick grandmother is visiting LA and Jessalynn is desperate for JoJo to have a featured role. However, Abby is not eager to take a big risk since MDP is out for revenge from their last loss.
142	25	"Abby vs. Kira"	June 30, 2015	1.26
The moms push Abby for more dance classes after losing two competitions in a row. When Abby refuses to take responsibility for the girls' lack of training, Kira takes matters into her own hands and brings in outside help, infuriating Abby. After Maddie's second place finish to Mackenzie, Abby pressures Maddie to regain her standing as the ALDC's top dancer. At the competition, Kira and Abby get into a huge fight causing Abby to leave before the group dance. The ALDC ends up losing for the third time in a row.
143	26	"Where in the World is Abby Lee Miller?"	July 7, 2015	1.18
After last week's blow out between Abby, Kira, and Kalani, all three are nowhere to be found. With only five weeks to go until Nationals, each girl has a solo to determine who will get a spot at the National Competition. Meanwhile, Kendall's single is dropping, but without her manager there to promote her, there is minimal fanfare. Nia meets with music producers to plan for her next single which includes a rap, a first for her. Therefore, Holly decides to enlist the help of a special guest, Shangela, to get Nia in the zone, which only serves to make Jill jealous.
144	27	"Abby vs. Kira ... AGAIN!"	July 14, 2015	1.36
With only four weeks until Nationals, the ALDC is desperate for a group routine win. To make matters worse, the Candy Apples return with Jeanette and they're ready to capitalize on ALDC's current misfortunes. The ALDC is traveling to Phoenix, Arizona and because Kira is still dissatisfied with Abby's treatment of Kalani, she brings in Alexa Moffett, Kalani's coach from Club Dance Studio in Arizona, which poses a direct threat to Abby. At the competition, Abby talks about pulling out one of the older girls to pull the group back down into the junior 9-11. With both Kalani and Nia in it, they pull the average age up, and Abby decides to pull Kalani out. Kira sees this as punishment, resulting in an unhappy Kira and a tearful Kalani leaving the team.
145	28	"Solo Battle: Round 1"	July 21, 2015	1.33
Jeanette officially takes over the Candy Apples and she's brings an epic routine featuring the Gay Men's Chorus of Los Angeles to the competition. Meanwhile, Abby tests the girls with a challenging prop. Later, Kendall and JoJo are the first to go head-to-head in a bracket-style showdown to see who will get a solo at Nationals. Kira and Kalani make a big decision that will determine their future with the ALDC.
146	29	"Baby Dance Mama Drama"	July 28, 2015	1.34
The ALDC is finally in their new LA studio and Abby announces that their official grand opening party will coincide with Nationals in two weeks. After Kendall beat JoJo last week, she's rewarded with a solo up against both Maddie and Mackenzie to determine once and for all who will get the solo at Nationals. The girls have tons of fun with a bridesmaid themed group dance and Kira announces big news—she's five months pregnant!
147	30	"Nia vs. Kalani... Winner Takes All"	August 4, 2015	1.22
This week is the last week before Nationals and Abby will have to decide who will get a solo. The girls are attending Dance Kids USA and they will be going against MDP. Nia and Kalani are each performing a solo against each other. Nia is shooting a music video, so Abby pulls her out of the group dance.
148	31	"Chaos at Nationals"	August 11, 2015	1.40
ALDC's competition season comes to a close with Nationals and the girls feel the pressure to remain undefeated and prevail in LA over their rivals at Broadway Dance Academy. But with Abby opening her new studio the day before competition, the girls are left with little time to prepare. The girls give their all to make their leader proud but the tension spirals out of control, leading to a chaotic ending unlike any Nationals before.
149	32	"City of Angels"	August 18, 2015	0.99
Coming off of a major loss at nationals, it's time for Abby and the dance moms to hash out what went wrong. Between live performances from the ALDC, Abby and the moms dish on their true feelings about nationals and some of the season's most shocking moments in LA. The moms are divided on hot button issues like Nia's music career, Kira's meltdown, Melissa's favoritism, and Abby's out of control behavior and lack of commitment to the team. Plus, there's a major surprise in store for one of the moms and Abby drops a bombshell.
150	-	"Slumber Party!"	August 18, 2015	0.58
In this Slumber Party special, Maddie takes us behind the scenes as she and the girls from Dance Moms dish on celebrity crushes, makeup tips, who takes the longest to get ready and more!
