= Dance Moms season 1 =

American dance reality television

Dance Moms
- Season 1
- Dance Moms Season 1 DVD cover
- Starring: Abby Lee Miller; Gianna Martello; Melissa Gisoni; Maddie Ziegler; Mackenzie Ziegler; Christi Lukasiak; Chloé Lukasiak; Kelly Hyland; Brooke Hyland; Paige Hyland; Holly Hatcher-Frazier; Nia Sioux; Cathy Nesbitt-Stein; Vivi-Anne Stein
- No. of episodes: 13

Release
- Original network: Lifetime
- Original release: July 13 – October 12, 2011

Season chronology
- Next → Season 2

The first season of Dance Moms, an American dance reality television created by Collins Avenue Productions, began airing on July 13, 2011 on Lifetime's television network. The season concluded on October 12, 2011. A total of 13 episodes aired this season.

== Overview ==
The first season introduces the leading dancers of the Abby Lee Dance Company, and their mothers. Throughout the season the dance team competes at various dance competitions around the US, finally reaching Nationals and competing for the title of overall top dance studio in the country. This season does feature the infamous Pyramid, however, it does not have as much an impact until the final episodes of the season. It also does not have a reunion special.

== Cast ==
The first season featured 13 star billing cast members with various other dancers and moms appearing throughout the season.

=== Dancers ===
- Maddie Ziegler
- Chloe Lukasiak
- Mackenzie Ziegler
- Nia Sioux
- Paige Hyland
- Brooke Hyland
- Vivi-Anne Stein

=== Moms ===
- Melissa Gisoni, mother of Maddie and Mackenzie Ziegler
- Christi Lukasiak, mother of Chloe Lukasiak
- Kelly Hyland, mother of Paige and Brooke Hyland
- Holly Hatcher-Frazier, mother of Nia Frazier
- Cathy Nesbitt-Stein, mother of Vivi-Anne Stein

=== Guests ===
- Brandon Pent and mother Diane Pent (Episode 8)
- Justice McCort (Episode 10)
- Taylor O'Lear (Episode 10)

=== Dance Coaches ===
- Abby Lee Miller, head choreographer for the Abby Lee Dance Company
- Gianna Martello, assistant choreographer to Abby Lee Miller
- Cathy Nesbitt-Stein (Episodes 9-10), head choreographer for Candy Apple's Dance Center

== Cast Duration ==
Dancer/Dance Mom	Episodes												
Dancer/Dance Mom	1	2	3	4	5	6	7	8	9	10	11	12	13
Brooke													
Chloe													
Mackenzie													
Maddie													
Nia													
Paige													
Vivi-Anne													
Christi													
Holly													
Kelly													
Melissa													
Cathy													

- Episode 13 is Abby showing clips of the season.

=== Notes ===
Key: = featured in this episode
Key: = not featured in this episode
Key: = joins the Abby Lee Dance Company
Key: = leaves the Abby Lee Dance Company

== Episodes ==
No. overall	No. in season	Title	Original release date	US viewers (millions)
1	1	"The Competition Begins"	July 13, 2011	1.05
Abby Lee Miller is the owner of her self-named dance company in Pittsburgh, Pennsylvania. Abby is known for her outrageous talents, no-nonsense behavior, and respectable reputation in dance. It is not easy to please Abby, nor is it a piece of cake to tolerate her presence. At competition, Chloe has a wardrobe malfunction on stage, leading to Abby and Christi bickering in the hallway. The other Dance Moms are not very pleased with Abby's attitude towards their children or them. Meanwhile, new mom Cathy from Candy Apple's Dance Center joins the team with her daughter Vivi-Anne, which displeases the mothers. Note: Cathy and Vivi-Anne join the ALDC.
2	2	"Wildly Inappropriate"	July 20, 2011	1.10
After seeing how provocative costumes won over the judges at the last competition, Abby designs revealing costumes for this week's group routine, and Kelly defends Abby's choices as other dancers also performed in revealing outfits. At competition, both the mothers and the judges feel the group routine and costuming are inappropriate, and the dance does not place in the leaderboards. Meanwhile, Cathy fears Vivi-Anne, who struggles during her duet rehearsal with Mackenzie, will not remember her dance.
3	3	"Cheerleader Blues"	July 27, 2011	1.05
Abby rehearses an acrobatic-style group routine and assigns Brooke the featured role. Brooke wishes to spend more time with her friends, and she is invited to go to the mall with her friends but because of dance schedules, she is not able to attend. As a dancer, Brooke says that she wants to be a cheerleader because of the intense pressure of dance and her friends are cheerleaders, but seeing as her mom quit dance to become a cheerleader, Kelly does not let her give up and feel regret, like she did. Brooke also begins to experience hip pain and Kelly takes her to a chiropractor. Meanwhile, Vivi-Anne feels uncomfortable with her solo, and Cathy decides to have her perform a dance she has already performed in the past without Abby's permission and Vivi-Anne, after performing the dance, says that the name of the studio that taught her the dance was "Candy Apple's Dance Center" which made Abby feel embarrassed and upset. After Brooke and the rest of the girls performed onstage, they won 1st place, despite Brooke's temporary injury.
4	4	"Stealing the Show"	August 3, 2011	0.85
In an effort to have every girl shine, Abby assigns each girl a solo, except for Maddie, who is given two. The mothers are concerned that Maddie has an advantage over the other girls performing twice, but Abby explains that Maddie shows strength in two genres of dance. Meanwhile, Abby assigns both Mackenzie and Vivi-Anne to perform solos, and both girls struggle with the choreography: Mackenzie fears she will forget her routine and Vivi-Anne is uncomfortable with her costume. After the winners are announced, there is an argument between Christi, Abby, and Melissa. Christi argues about how it was not fair how Maddie won 1st place, as she was given two solos. Abby and Melissa try to ignore her but Christi's anger gets the best of her and she argues with Abby and Melissa in front of the children, leaving them scared and upset.
5	5	"When Stars Collide"	August 10, 2011	0.89
The ALDC readies the studio after a casting director from Broadway announces his arrival. Each girl is asked to do a short performance and to sing when asked. Sadly, each audition turns sour. Meanwhile, this week is the annual ALDC recital, and Abby is very stressed. The mothers are asked to do a performance onstage, and Cathy is asked to choreograph the routine. Much to everyone's embarrassment, Cathy approaches stage front and begins to improvise.
6	6	"Dying to Dance"	August 17, 2011	1.36
Abby rehearses a group routine of a serious nature, in which each dancer slowly disappears from the performance. The mothers are concerned about the theme of the dance, and feel the dance is too dark for Mackenzie and Vivi-Anne. At competition, everyone shows distaste for Brooke's solo costume, and Abby asks if she can wear an outfit of Vivi-Anne's, which upsets Cathy. Meanwhile, Christi is unsure about attending the competition after finding out her grandmother is in the hospital.
7	7	"She's a Fighter"	August 24, 2011	1.38
Nia is assigned a solo inspired by the drag queen Laquifa. Holly is concerned about the nature of the dance, and considers it to be less of a performance and more of a simple strut across the stage. Abby tells Holly the need for typecasting as Nia will grow up only to audition for such roles. Meanwhile, Maddie is assigned a solo to which she dedicates to her late grandmother. Additionally, Cathy is confident Vivi-Anne will win the photogenic award at competition.
8	8	"Love on the Dance Floor"	August 31, 2011	1.62
Brooke is assigned the featured role in the group routine, and Abby has brought in Brandon a senior dancer at ALDC to rehearse partnering with Brooke. In an effort to spark chemistry between the pair, Abby sets up an outing for them. At competition, the two show little chemistry in their performance, and the group dance does not place. After performing her solo, Maddie is selected to perform in the adjoining pageant, and wins a title award, despite facing competition from one of her rivals Holly reaches her breaking point at competition after arguing with Abby. Meanwhile, Cathy and Vivi-Anne, frustrated with the traveling, return to their old studio, Candy Apples Dance Center. Note: Cathy and Vivi-Anne leave the ALDC.
9	9	"From Ballerinas to Showgirls"	September 7, 2011	1.73
Abby rehearses a group routine based on the seven deadly sins and assigns each girl a role, which concerns the mothers. Meanwhile, Brooke rehearses a new piece with plenty of tricks, hoping to be seen by someone from Cirque du Soleil, but feels tension in her shoulder while performing. Abby gives Maddie the week off, and gives Chloe the chance to do a solo. At competition, none of the dances place top three, which upsets Abby saying that the team has failed her. Additionally, Cathy readies the Candy Apples for competition.
10	10	"Cathy Brings It On!"	September 14, 2011	1.75
Brooke and Paige are assigned solos this weekend, but aren't given enough attention by Abby, which leads to Kelly outsourcing a choreographer to teach them new dances. When Paige does not learn her dance on time, her dance gets pulled. Meanwhile, Abby brings in drag queen Laquifa to inspire the girls and teach them new moves. Maddie is given a solo where she must portray an abused child. At competition, the ALDC is shocked to find Cathy and the Candy Apples are scheduled to perform. In a strange twist, to psych Chloe out Cathy has one of her students dance to the same music as Chloe's.
11	11	"It All Ends Here"	September 28, 2011	1.51
The pressure is on to see who will win the National title this weekend. Abby assigns two duets to go head-to-head between Chloe/Maddie and Brooke/Paige. Kelly is upset that Brooke and Paige's costumes are poorly made and the choreography is not as great as it could be. Chloe feels tired of dance and tells Christi she is considering quitting because of the extreme stress and exhaustion, but later has a heart-to-heart with Abby. Meanwhile, Melissa leaves Maddie and Mackenzie with Gianna to vacation with her boyfriend, which upsets their father who then spends the whole competition with them and after he and Abby have an argument, he threatens to pull his children out of her school next year.
12	12	"There's Only One Star"	October 5, 2011	1.80
Abby brings the girls to Los Angeles for their first audition to appear as background dancers in a music video for aspiring singer Lux, which excites the girls. The girls go in for a rehearsal with many other trained dancers to learn a hip-hop combination, and Mackenzie feels defeated when she finds the dance challenging. After the audition, the ALDC is selected to appear in the music video, but only one dancer will earn the featured role. Based on looks, the selection boils down to Maddie and Chloe.
13	13	"Most Outrageous Moments"	October 12, 2011	N/A
Abby Lee Miller hosts a clip show featuring the fifteen most outrageous moments seen on Dance Moms.

== Reception ==
Season 1 cast members, excluding Cathy Nesbitt-Stein and Vivi-Anne Stein.

Dance Moms received heavy criticism upon its premiere in 2011. On Metacritic, the first season holds a score of 54 out of 100, based on 4 critics, indicating "mixed or average" reviews.

Once you get past the reality-TV grabbers, you realize that while there is some of that, more importantly there's a lot of Miller. It is great to watch her work.

— Linda Stasi, New York Post

The new worst show on television debuted Wednesday night on Lifetime—Dance Moms, an ugly docu-circus featuring a megaton bully of a Pittsburgh dance instructor, the little princesses she costumes as lunatic street whores, and a quorum of strenuously pathetic stage mothers, one of whom warbles that she would slit her wrists if her daughter even thought of trying out for softball.

— Troy Patterson, Slate
