= Chloé Lukasiak =

American actress and dancer (born 2001)

Chloe Lukasiak
- Born: Chloe Elizabeth Lukasiak; May 25, 2001 (age 25); Pittsburgh, Pennsylvania, U.S.
- Occupations: Actress; dancer; author; social media personality
- Years active: 2011–present

YouTube information
- Channel: Chloe Lukasiak
- Years active: 2010–present
- Genre: Vlog
- Subscribers: 2.49 million
- Views: 321 million
- Last updated: October 30, 2026

Chloe Elizabeth Lukasiak (born May 25, 2001) is an American actress, dancer, author, and social media personality. She earned recognition as a child, appearing on Lifetime's reality show Dance Moms (2011–2014, 2017) and becoming a fan favorite. After departing from the show, Lukasiak expanded her career into acting and writing, and built a social media gathering of 100 million followers across multiple platforms.

== Early life ==
Lukasiak was born on May 25, 2001, in Pittsburgh, Pennsylvania to Christina "Christi" (née Zook) and Marc Lukasiak. She has a younger sister, Clara. The family resides in Mars, Pennsylvania. She is of Polish, Scottish, German, and Italian descent.

Lukasiak began dance classes at the Abby Lee Dance Company at age two. At first, she did "the basics" such as jazz and ballet. But as she got older she started to do more styles and has trained in everything except ballroom and Latin. From the ages of five to thirteen, Lukasiak competed throughout the United States as part of the Abby Lee Dance Company, winning numerous titles at the regional, state, and national levels. Lukasiak competed on Dance Moms in many dance genres: lyrical, contemporary, musical theatre, ballet, jazz, hip-hop, acro, Spanish, and Bollywood.

== Career ==
=== Dance Moms ===
In 2011, Lukasiak and her mother, alongside Abby Lee Dance Company owner Abby Lee Miller, other young dancers, and their mothers, were cast on Lifetime's Dance Moms. Together they made up Miller's Junior Elite Competition Team.

After the Los Angeles national competition in July 2014 (filmed for an episode aired October 7, 2014), Lukasiak's mother decided that the environment of the TV show along with her own negative relationship with Miller was detrimental to her daughter and they decided to leave ALDC. The finale episode of Season 4 was their last appearance on Dance Moms as part of the main cast partially because of Miller being unappreciative about the fact that Lukasiak was the highest scoring ALDC soloist at Nationals, beating teammates Kendall Vertes and Kamryn Beck and Miller making a nasty comment about Lukasiak's eye. (Note: In 2015, Lukasiak said she had been teased "for a while" about her "lazy eye", which was the result of a medical condition, silent sinus syndrome. She had corrective surgery in September 2015.)

On January 27, 2017, Lukasiak announced that she would return to guest-star on Dance Moms for the Season 7 finale and Season 7B. Lukasiak first joined Murrieta Dance Project, but then left to form The Irreplaceables with Nia Sioux, Kendall Vertes, Kalani Hilliker, and Camryn Bridges. On November 1, 2023, Lifetime announced a Dance Moms reunion in 2024 featuring Lukasiak and several other original cast members returning, including JoJo Siwa and Kalani Hilliker.

=== Dancing ===
After the end of Dance Moms season 4, Lukasiak left ALDC for good and switched to Studio 19 Dance Complex. Lukasiak's competition team from Studio 19 went on to win nationals in July 2015. In high demand now that she was free of the ALDC, Lukasiak was invited to be a demonstrator and assistant for Blake McGrath in the VIP Dance Events convention in Calgary in October 2014. Lukasiak has also posted many professionally-filmed dance videos on her YouTube channel as a series called "Team Chloe Dance Project". She won "Choice Dancer" at the 2015 Teen Choice Awards and the "Dancers Choice Award" for "Favorite Dancer 17 & Under" at the 2015 Industry Dance Awards. She was once again nominated for the "Choice Dancer" award at the 2016 and 2017 Teen Choice Awards. She was nominated for a Shorty Award in the category of 'Best in Dance' but lost to Misty Copeland. Lukasiak joined the Triple Threat Talent Tour as a guest performer and assistant for several dance conventions in 2015/2016. In 2016, Lukasiak collaborated with Playtex Sport and starred in their "Ready, Set, Play On!" campaign commercial as a dancer. That same year, Lukasiak partnered with Ownzones to launch her own dance web series called Chloe on Pointe.

Lukasiak signed with Lifetime in April 2017 to star in her own web series called "Chloe Does It". In 2017, Lukasiak filmed an anti-bullying dance video for Seventeen Magazine. In December 2017, Lukasiak began touring with Kalani Hilliker and Kendall Vertes on The Irreplaceables Tour. In 2019, Lukasiak took part in the Tate McRae "Tear Myself Apart" Dance Contest, placing in the top 5 out of over 100 participants. In 2023, Lukasiak announced Elevé Dance Competition,, which she co-founded alongside her mother, Christi Lukasiak, Diane Pent, and Brittany Pent. The dance competition was only held during the 2024 season.

=== Acting ===
In 2011, Lukasiak started her acting career with an acting lesson from Howard Fine for her role in LUX's (daughter of actor Ted Danson) music video for It's Like Summer. Then, in 2012, Lukasiak auditioned for the role of "Young Deb" on the Lifetime show Drop Dead Diva, but lost the role to fellow Dance Moms cast member, Maddie Ziegler. Lukasiak also auditioned for the role of "Annie" in the 2012 Broadway musical Annie, but lost the part to actresses Lilla Crawford and Sadie Sink. Lukasiak later auditioned in 2013 for the role of "Maddy" in the 2015 film Spare Parts, but lost the role to actress Aubrey Miller.

Lukasiak has appeared in numerous music videos, as during the filming of Dance Moms she appeared in videos for artists Brooke Hyland and LUX (daughter of actor Ted Danson). Also during the filming of Dance Moms, Lukasiak created a fan made music video for Katy Perry's "Last Friday Night" with Maddie Ziegler using the app Video Star; the video has over 10 million views on YouTube.

Lukasiak's debut acting role was as Gwen Murphy in the 2016 Lifetime TV movie Center Stage: On Pointe. In an interview released on June 15, 2016, Lukasiak said she was grateful to Dance Moms because it showed her how much she loves acting and that she has a passion for it. She was later cast as Savanah Stocker in A Cowgirl's Story alongside Bailee Madison and has since been cast as the lead role in the science-fiction/inspirational thriller called Loophole, and supporting roles in the family-friendly movies Camp Arrowhead, Next Level, and F.R.E.D.I. In 2016, Lukasiak played a character named Flynn Harrington for episodes in a TV series called Welcome To My World, however, the series never made it to air. Lukasiak appeared in a commercial for the TV show Superstore in 2016 as a store employee.

In 2015, she appeared as the lead for Jess Godwin's song "Fool Me Once", Solveig Romero's "Turn It Up" and Bianca Ryan's "Alice", as well as "Wrapped Up For Christmas" by Forever in Your Mind. In 2016, Lukasiak appeared in AJ Lehrman's music video for his new single "Tongue" and a video for transgender vocalist Ali J for her cover of "Piece By Piece" by Kelly Clarkson, which was featured on CNN.

Lukasiak had a supporting role in her former Dance Moms costar Nia Sioux's music video for her song "Dance (Just Rock)" in 2017. Lukasiak most recently appeared in a music video in 2019 for Barbie called "We're Taking Over." Lukasiak provided her acting talents in the 2020 short film Beautiful Scars as a Co-Lead with two other actors and a character for a story called Limelight in an Interactive app called YarnTexts. In February 2020, Lukasiak appeared as a Werewolf in a promotional short for the Disney Channel original movie, Zombies 2. On April 22, 2021, Lukasiak acted in the Earth Day comedy skit Earth Day! The Musical with Bill Nye, Justin Bieber, Zac Efron and other celebrities on Facebook Watch. In December 2024, Lukasiak, along with her younger sister, guest starred in a Pittsburgh production of The Nutcracker.

== Public image ==
=== Fashion and endorsements ===
Lukasiak began modeling for fashion lines Glitzy Girl, Oxyjen, Tutu DuMonde and Sally Miller in 2012–13. Following her leave from Dance Moms in 2014, she modeled for various clothing brands including 90 Degrees by Reflex, Good hYOUman, Boy Meets Girl, and BCBG Max Azria (runway). Lukasiak became a spokesmodel for Just For Kix, an American dancewear company, in October 2014. With the company's partnership, she created an anti-bullying campaign called #NobodyisYOU. She was featured in several videos relating to the cause alongside dancers such as Averee Jade.

In 2016, Lukasiak became the new face of StyleHaul. Lukasiak has also modeled for many magazines including The Hollywood Reporter, In Touch Weekly, Nationalist, Inside Dance, LVLten, LowCountry Parent, Cliche, NKD, Pulse Spikes, Dream, YSBNow, Afterglow, Popstar!, Girls' Life, Prune, Dance Track and A Book Of.

In 2017, Lukasiak began working on a fashion line in collaboration with Dazzine. That same year, after Dazzine unexpectedly folded, she curated the Rocking Ballerina shoe/fashion line with JustFab. and a Christmas fashion line through the same company. In 2018, Lukasiak became an ambassador for JustFab and released videos featuring monthly shoe picks from the brand. During NY Fashion Week in February 2018, Lukasiak became a "Gelwick Girl," being styled by Andrew Gelwicks for her book tour and fashion shows at New York Fashion Week.

In 2015, Lukasiak appeared in a commercial for the fast food chain, Sonic. Lukasiak also hosted the miniseries Wicked Weekly that year, which was 16 episodes that aired on Disney Channel leading up to the release of the 2017 Disney Channel original film, Descendants 2. Lukasiak started partnering with Maybelline in 2019 and appeared in an ad for their product Snapscara alongside Skai Jackson, Summer McKeen, Jordyn Jones and Roxette Arisa. Later that year, Lukasiak collabed with Victoria's Secret PINK and Awesomeness TV to host a miniseries titled 'GRL PWR', which is about women's goals and life in college. In 2022, Lukasiak collaborated with Evry Jewels for a jewelry line that launched on January 15.

=== Writing ===
During her second year of high school Lukasiak took a creative writing class. After that she began writing short stories and poems and decided to pursue a career in writing. She contributed a piece detailing her experience with overcoming bullying in the 2016 Pulse Spikes book "Ignite!".

Lukasiak signed with Bloomsbury Publishing in 2017 and the next year released her debut book Girl on Pointe: Chloe's Guide to Taking On The World. Lukasiak also wrote, prepared and gave a speech at the 2017 UN International Day of Peace at the United Nations Headquarters in New York City, New York.

In 2018, Lukasiak teamed up with Girls' Life to launch Chloe's Book Club. In 2020, the partnership ended and the book club became Bestie Book Club. In February 2021, Lukasiak re-launched the book club under her own leadership rather than under a partnership. On November 18, 2021, it was announced that Lukasiak partnered up with Literati for her book club now titled Let's Escape. The book club ran for a little over a year before Literati discontinued their adult book clubs in January 2023.

In May 2020, Lukasiak created an Instagram account dedicated to sharing things that she has written with her fans and has announced her intention to write a fantasy book series. In April 2021, Lukasiak announced that she had written a piece of Rosie Day's upcoming book Instructions for a Teenage Armageddon: 30 Kick-Ass Women On How To Take Over The World. The book was released on October 14, 2021.

In November 2025, former Dance Moms costar Nia Sioux published her book, Bottom of the Pyramid: A Memoir of Persevering, Dancing for Myself, and Starring in My Own Life. Lukasiak wrote the foreword for the book, noted Nia, "which is really, really, really special."

== Personal life ==
In 2015, Lukasiak was diagnosed with silent sinus syndrome, and had surgery to correct the condition.

In 2019, Lukasiak was accepted into Pepperdine University, where she studied creative writing and marketing, and graduated in December 2023. In April 2020, Lukasiak revealed that she had been battling three types of eating disorders for the past few years by posting a poem that she had written about it on her Instagram account. Lukasiak elaborated more about her experience with her eating disorders in a video on her official YouTube channel.

From 2015 to 2016, Lukasiak dated actor Ricky Garcia. In 2020 Lukasiak began dating skateboarder and influencer Brooklinn "Brook" Khoury. In May 2024 she revealed to PEOPLE that the relationship had ended and that she had "been single for a while".

=== Politics ===
Lukasiak has expressed publicly that she is liberal and showed support for U.S. President Joe Biden during the 2020 Presidential election. On social media, Lukasiak has come out in support of immigrants, LGBTQ youth, mental health support, anti-drug pledges, animal rights, preventing school shootings, Black Lives Matter, women's rights and awareness of eating disorders.

== Filmography ==
=== Film ===
Year	Title	Role	Notes	Ref.
2017	A Cowgirl's Story	Savannah Stocker	Also choreographer	
2017	Loophole	Alexandra "Lexi" Jones		
2018	F.R.E.D.I.	Mallory	Also executive producer	
2019	Next Level	Jasmine Joel		
2020	Camp Arrowhead	Devin Dupree		
2020	Beautiful Scars	Ashley/Mandy	Short film	

=== Television ===
Year	Series	Role	Notes	Ref.
2011–2014, 2017	Dance Moms	Herself	Main role (season 1–4, 7)	
2011	Good Day L.A.	Herself	1 episode	
2011	The Today Show	Herself	1 episode	
2012	Anderson Live	Herself	Episode: "Renegade Moms & Kristen Johnston"	
2012	Katie	Herself	1 episode	
2012	Nightline	Herself	1 episode	
2012–2013	The View	Herself	2 episodes	
2013	Dance Moms: Holiday Special	Herself	Television special	
2015	The Doctors	Herself	1 episode	
2015–2019	KTLA	Herself	4 episodes	
2016	Center Stage: On Pointe	Gwendolyn "Gwen" Murphy	Television film	
2016	Superstore	Herself	Season 2 promo video	
2016	Welcome to My World	Flynn Harrington	5 episodes	
2017	Hollywood Today Live	Herself	1 episode	
2017	Jump, Jive and Thrive	Herself	Television special	
2017–2018	Home & Family	Herself	2 episodes	
2018	Celebrity Page	Herself	1 episode	
2019	Famously Afraid	Herself	Television special	
2022	Our New Normal: How Teens Are Redefining School Life	Herself	Television special	
2024	Dance Moms: The Reunion	Herself	Television special	
2024	Watch What Happens Live With Andy Cohen	Herself	1 episode	
2024	Good Morning America	Herself	1 episode	

=== Music videos ===
Year	Song	Artist	Notes	Ref.
2011	"It's Like Summer"	LUX		
2012	"Summer Love Song"	Brooke Hyland		
2012	"Last Friday Night"	Katy Perry	Fanmade Music Video with Maddie Ziegler	
2015	"Fool Me Once"	Jess Godwin		
2015	"Turn It Up"	Solveig Romero		
2015	"Alice"	Bianca Ryan		
2015	"Wrapped Up For Christmas"	Forever in Your Mind		
2015	"Love is Blindness"	Jack White	Team Chloe Dance Project	
2016	"Tongue"	AJ Lehrman		
2016	"Piece by Piece"	Ali J	Video Deleted From YouTube	
2017	"Dance (Just Rock)"	Nia Sioux		
2019	"We're Taking Over"	Barbie		

=== Podcast ===
Year	Title	Notes
2021	Crazy Stupid Fangirls	
2021	Christi's Couch	
2021	Always Evolving With Coach Mike Bayer	
2023	Back to the Barre	
2026	Casual Chaos with Gia Giudice	
2026	Not So Little with Kendall Vertes	

=== Web series ===
Key
•	Denotes acting credits

Year	Series	Role	Notes	Ref.
2016	Chloe on Pointe	Herself	22 Episodes	
2016	Pretty Unfiltered	Herself		
2017	Ready, Set, Style	Herself	20 Episodes	
2017	Chloe Does It	Herself	5 Episodes	
2017	Descendants 2: Wicked Weekly	Host	16 Episodes	
2018	Limelight •	Dani	10 Episodes, also Co-Executive Producer	
2019	Unstoppable	Herself		
2019	GRL PWR: A Day in The Life	Host	4 Episodes	
2020	Zombies 2: The Collab •	Werewolf	Short	
2020	Dream Digs	Herself		
2021	Hair Me Out	Herself		
2021	Earth Day! The Musical •	Herself/Wind	Comedy Short	
2022	DC Shoes: Push Your Own Story	Herself	Documentary Short	
2024	Follow Me	Herself	1 episode: "Feel Good Factor"	

== Awards and nominations ==
Year	Award Show	Category	Recipients and nominees	Outcome	Ref.
2011	Youth America Grand Prix	Women - Pre Competitive Age Division	Chloe Lukasiak	Top 12	
2015	Teen Choice Awards	Choice Dancer	Chloe Lukasiak	Won	
2015	Industry Dance Awards	Dancer's Choice Awards 2015 – Favorite Dancer 17 & Under	Chloe Lukasiak	Won	
2016	Shorty Awards	Shorty Awards – Best in Dance	Chloe Lukasiak	Nominated	
2016	Teen Choice Awards	Choice Dancer	Chloe Lukasiak	Nominated	
2016	CelebMix Awards	Best Dancer	Chloe Lukasiak	Won	
2016	Twist Magazine Style Awards	Trendsetter of the Year	Chloe Lukasiak	Won	
2016	Twist Magazine Style Awards	Best Pierced Hair	Chloe Lukasiak	Won	
2016	J-14 Magazine Icon Awards	Icon of the Year	Chloe Lukasiak	Won	
2017	CelebMix Awards	Best Dancer	Chloe Lukasiak	Nominated	
2017	Tigerbeat Magazine 19 Under 19 Awards	Best Girl Power Icon	Chloe Lukasiak	Won	
2017	Teen Choice Awards	Choice Dancer	Chloe Lukasiak	Nominated	
2018	CelebMix Awards	Best Dancer	Chloe Lukasiak	Nominated	
2018	Industry Dance Awards	Favorite Inside Dance Cover Star	Chloe Lukasiak	Nominated	
2018	J-14 Magazine Icon Awards	Iconic Female Star	Chloe Lukasiak	Won	

== Writings ==
Year	Title	Writing Type	Ref.
2017	UN International Day of Peace Speech	Speech	
2018	Girl on Pointe: Chloe's Guide To Taking On The World	Auto-Biography	
2020	My Daily Sacrifice	Poem	
2021	Instructions for a Teenage Armageddon: 30 Kick-Ass Women On How To Take Over The World	Notes/Letters/Personal Essays	
2025	Bottom of the Pyramid: A Memoir of Preserving Myself, and Starring in My Own Life	Memoir/Auto-Biography	

== Tours ==
- Christi & Chloe's UK Tour (2014)
- Christi & Chloe's UK Tour (2015)
- Christi & Chloe's OZ Tour: Sequins & Secrets (2015)
- Triple Threat Talent Tour (2015–16)
- The Irreplaceables Tour (2017–18)

== See also ==
- List of dancers
