= Famously Afraid =

2019 American television series

- Country of origin: United States
- Original language: English

Original release
- Network: Travel Channel
- Release: November 5, 2019

Famously Afraid is an American television series. The series premiered on Travel Channel on November 5, 2019. The show features celebrities who discuss their experiences with the paranormal.

Guests on the show include Howie Mandel, Hal Sparks, Chloe Lukasiak, Montel Williams, Richie Ramone, Geraldo Rivera, Kate Flannery, Brandi Glanville, Carson Kressley, Amber Rose, Chris Kattan, R.J. Mitte, Steve Guttenberg, Tori Spelling, Ed Lover, Todd Bridges, Patti Stanger, John Melendez, Parker Stevenson and Ty Pennington.

== See also ==
- Celebrity Ghost Stories
