= Jessica Ewing =

American innovator and entrepreneur

- Born: Michigan
- Education: Stanford University
- Occupations: Founder and CEO Literati (book club)

Jessica Ewing is an American innovator and entrepreneur. She is the founder and CEO of the children’s book subscription startup Literati founded in Austin, Texas.

== Early life and education ==
Jessica Ewing was born in Michigan. She completed her undergraduate degree at Stanford University, where she studied mathematics and artificial intelligence. While at Stanford, she worked in the White House as a research assistant for the senior economic adviser to the president.

== Career ==
After graduating Stanford with a degree in Symbolic Systems, Ewing joined Google and became a senior product manager. During her first year at the company, she was Marissa Mayer’s deputy. She later worked under Sundar Pichai.

She co-authored eight patents while with Google. Some of the patents protected inventions for: module specification for a module to be incorporated into a container document, and methods and system for sharing gadgets between users.

Ewing also helped launch iGoogle, which let users customize the Google homepage. Fast Company named her one of Google’s “12 Most Innovative Minds”.

In 2009, Ewing left Google and moved to Hawaii to begin work on a novel.

Upon finishing her novel, Ewing began reaching out to literary agents and publishing houses but found the experience incohesive. The publishing process, she thought, could be better organized. To address this concern, Ewing built a platform designed to connect writers with publishers and agents. This platform was called Excerpt.

Throughout the process of pitching to investors, Ewing’s platform went through several different iterations. Eventually, Ewing decided to narrow her focus to children’s books, and in 2016, she founded the company called Literati. Ewing is the CEO.
