= A Cowgirl's Story =

- DVD cover
- Directed by: Timothy Armstrong
- Written by: Timothy Armstrong
- Produced by: Bailee Madison; Carlos De Mattos; Marcos De Mattos
- Starring: Bailee Madison; Pat Boone; Chloe Lukasiak; Aidan Alexander; Froy Gutierrez; James C. Victor; Alicia Coppola
- Cinematography: Matthias Saunders
- Edited by: Tyler Purcell
- Production companies: Samuel Goldwyn Films; Cinemills Media; Rodeo Films; Bailee Madison Productions
- Distributed by: Sony Pictures Home Entertainment
- Release date: April 18, 2017
- Running time: 98 minutes
- Country: United States
- Language: English

A Cowgirl's Story is a 2017 American drama film written and directed by Timothy Armstrong and starring Bailee Madison, Chloe Lukasiak and Pat Boone. It is the third film in the Cowgirls 'n Angels series.

== Plot ==
Seventeen year old Dusty Rhodes (Bailee Madison) goes to live with her grandfather (Pat Boone) because both of her Army parents are fighting in the Afghanistan war. Dusty attends a new high school where she makes friends with a group that includes Savanah (Chloe Lukasiak), a goth girl whose late father also served in the Army. Dusty convinces her new friends to form an equestrian drill team that allows them to perform at rodeos and parades. Dusty's world is turned upside down by the war when her mother goes missing after her helicopter is shot down. To cope with her fear and helplessness, Dusty enlists the help of her grandfather and friends to put on a special riding performance for her parents and all of the soldiers fighting overseas. The entire town turns out in support of the event, and it becomes an unforgettable experience for everyone.

== Cast ==
- Bailee Madison as Dusty Rhodes
- Pat Boone as Grandpa Rhodes
- Chloe Lukasiak as Savanah Stocker
- Aidan Alexander as Trevor
- Froy Gutierrez as Jason
- James C. Victor as Randall Rhodes
- Alicia Coppola as Lt. Helen Rhodes
- Aedin Mincks as Dale

In May 2016, Bailee Madison was confirmed to be starring in the film as well as acting as a producer. Chloe Lukasiak joined the cast later in the same month. Corlandos Scott was cast to play a detective in the film.

== Reception ==
James Plath of Family Home Theater gave the film a grade C, and wrote: "The biggest problem with A Cowgirl's Story is that everything is too far-fetched, familiar, or unbelievably easy."

== See also ==
- List of films about horses
