= StyleHaul =

Marketing company (2011–2019)

StyleHaul, Inc.
- Industry: Marketing
- Headquarters: Los Angeles, CA
- Number of locations: Los Angeles, New York, Chicago, London, Singapore
- Services: Communications; Data analysis; Media planning; Original content
- Parent: RTL Group
- Website: stylehaul.com at the Wayback Machine (archived April 23, 2019)

StyleHaul, Inc. was an American advertising company. It gained recognition as an early pioneer of branded content and native advertising on digital platforms. The company was founded in 2011 by Stephanie Horbaczewski and operated as a portfolio company of RTL Group, which paid $127 million USD to acquire a controlling stake in the company in 2014.

StyleHaul was known for its influencer and paid media campaigns for beauty brands and retailers such as Sephora, Maybelline, and Walgreens, as well as for its talent network, which included creators like Zoella, Ashley Tisdale, Chloe Lukasiak and Joey Graceffa.

In 2018, founder and CEO Stephanie Horbaczewski left the company in order to launch an artificial intelligence startup, Vody, alongside former StyleHaul Chief Technology Officer Jeremy Houghton.

In 2019, StyleHaul shuttered operations, which coincided with the arrest and guilty plea of Dennis Blieden, 29, a former StyleHaul executive and professional poker player who embezzled $22 million from the company to pay his poker debts, personal debts and bad investments in cryptocurrencies. Stylehaul's remaining talent moved to RTL's Divimove, a merger of their European MCNs.
