= Abby's Ultimate Dance Competition =

2012 American Lifetime network television series

- Title card
- Genre: Reality competition
- Presented by: Kevin Manno
- Judges: Abby Lee Miller; Richy Jackson; Robin Antin (season 1); Rachelle Rak (season 2)
- Country of origin: United States
- Original language: English
- No. of seasons: 2
- No. of episodes: 22

Production
- Executive producers: Jeff Collins; Michael Hammond; Sandi Johnson; Abby Lee Miller; Rob Sharenow; Gena McCarthy; Kimberly Chessler; Toby Faulkner; Adam Vetri; John Corella
- Running time: 42 minutes
- Production company: Collins Avenue Productions

Original release
- Network: Lifetime
- Release: October 9, 2012 – November 19, 2013

Related
- Dance Moms

Abby's Ultimate Dance Competition is an American dance reality competition series on Lifetime. A spinoff of the hit reality television series Dance Moms, the series follows twelve talented boy and girl dancers who are competing for $100,000 and a scholarship to the prestigious Joffrey Ballet Academy. The show is hosted by Kevin Manno, and judged by Abby Lee Miller, Richy Jackson, and Robin Antin. Season 2 premiered on September 3, 2013, with Rachelle Rak replacing Robin Antin in the judging panel.

== Season 1 Cast ==
=== Dancers ===
- Brianna Haire, a lyrical/jazz dancer from Temecula, California. She became the first winner of Abby's Ultimate Dance Competition, winning the $100,000 and the scholarship to the young dancers program at the Joffrey Ballet School in New York.
- Madison O'Connor, a lyrical/jazz dancer from Boca Raton, Florida. She was the runner-up of the competition.
- Asia Monet Ray, a jazz/contemporary dancer and singer from Corona, California. She was placed 3rd in the competition, and was beaten by Madison and Brianna. Asia later joined Dance Moms briefly in season three, dancing with the Junior Elite Competition Team at the Abby Lee Dance Company (ALDC) and left just before Nationals.
- Amanda Carbajales, a lyrical/jazz dancer from Miami, Florida. She placed in 4th in the competition.
- Jordyn Jones, a hip-hop/contemporary dancer from Three Rivers, Michigan. During a flexibility test, she was successful in the test until she pulled a muscle, which lead to her being sent home and placing her 5th in the competition.
- Hadley Walts, a jazz dancer from Evansville, Indiana. She was placed 6th in the competition. Hadley later appeared on Dance Moms to be a guest dancer for the Candy Apples Dance Center (CADC) in seasons three and four.
- Lexine Cantoria, a jazz/contemporary dancer from Norco, California. She was placed 7th in the competition.
- Elisabeth Tracy, a lyrical/contemporary dancer from Coto de Caza, California. She was placed 8th in the competition.
- Lennon Torres (appeared as Zack Torres), a lyrical/jazz dancer from Phoenix, Arizona. She placed 9th in the competition. Lennon later appeared on Dance Moms to be a guest dancer for the CADC in seasons three, four, and seven. She was the first Abby's Ultimate Dance Competition cast member to join Dance Moms.
- Tua Tevaga, a lyrical/jazz funk dancer from Daytona Beach, Florida. She placed 10th in the competition.
- Kyleigh Jai Colchico-Greeley, a lyrical/jazz dancer from Pittsburg, California. She was placed 11th in the competition.
- Tessa Wilkinson, a lyrical/contemporary dancer from Scottsdale, Arizona. She was placed 12th in the competition. Tessa later appeared on Dance Moms to be a guest dancer for the CADC in season five as well as a guest for JC's Broadway Dance Academy in seasons five and six.
- Amanda Kelly, a lyrical/musical theatre dancer from Rochester Hills, Michigan. She was placed 13th in the competition.
- Nicole Yu, a jazz dancer from San Jose, California. She was the first sent home, placing her 14th.

=== Moms ===
- Kris Haire, mother of Brianna.
- Coreen O'Connor, mother of Madison.
- Kristie Ray, mother of Asia.
- Mayelin Carbajales, mother of Amanda C.
- Kelly Jones, mother of Jordyn.
- Yvette Walts, mother of Hadley.
- Maria Cantoria, mother of Lexine.
- Erin Tracy, mother of Elisabeth.
- Gina Torres, mother of Zack.
- Shayna Tevaga, mother of Tua.
- Kristen Colchico-Greeley, mother of Kyleigh.
- Renée Wilkinson, mother of Tessa.
- Michelle Kelly, mother of Amanda K.
- Sabrina Jackson, mother of Nicole.

== Season 2 Cast ==
=== Dancers ===
- McKaylee True, a lyrical/contemporary dancer from Lincoln, Nebraska. She became the second winner of Abby's Ultimate Dance Competition.
- Gianna Newborg, a lyrical/jazz dancer from Yardley, Pennsylvania. She was the runner-up of the competition.
- Trinity Inay, a jazz/hip-hop dancer from Seattle, Washington. She was placed 3rd in the competition, and was beaten by Gianna and McKaylee.
- Kalani Hilliker, a lyrical/contemporary dancer from Mesa, Arizona. She was placed 4th in the competition. Kalani was brought to the ALDC during season four on Dance Moms to replace Brooke and Paige Hyland. After several weeks with the ALDC team in season four, she was made into a permanent team member in season five. Kalani left the ALDC during season seven to form "The Irreplaceables" with several other elite team members, and left the show entirely following the season finale.
- JoJo Siwa, a jazz/hip-hop dancer from Omaha, Nebraska. She was placed 5th in the competition. JoJo was brought to the ALDC during season five on Dance Moms to replace Chloe Lukasiak. After several episodes as a guest dancer, she was made into a permanent team member, but left the show near the end of season six after signing a contract with Nickelodeon. JoJo also made a guest appearance on Dance Moms in season eight and in the season finale of season 7.
- Travis Atwood, a hip-hop/contemporary dancer from Jamestown, Rhode Island. He was placed 6th in the competition.
- Ally Robinson, a hip-hop/jazz funk dancer from Yorba Linda, California. She was placed 7th in the competition.
- Tyler Atwood, a hip-hop dancer from Jamestown and Travis' identical twin brother. He was placed 8th in the competition.
- Haley Huelsman, a lyrical/musical theatre dancer from Madison, Connecticut. She was placed 9th in the competition. Haley later appeared on Dance Moms as a guest dancer for the CADC during seasons five and seven.
- Chloe Beatty, a contemporary ballet/lyrical/jazz funk dancer from Winston-Salem, North Carolina. She was placed 10th in the competition.
- Sarina Jassy, a lyrical/jazz dancer from San Diego. She was the first sent home, placing her 11th.

=== Moms ===
- Shari True, mother of McKaylee
- Cindy Passanante-Walton, mother of Gianna
- Tina Inay, mother of Trinity
- Kira Girard, mother of Kalani
- Jessalynn Siwa, mother of JoJo
- Sheryl Atwood, mother of Travis and Tyler
- Tiffany Robinson, mother of Ally
- Melanie Huelsman, mother of Haley
- Angela Beatty, mother of Chloe
- Sharon Jassy, mother of Sarina

== Episodes ==
=== Season 1 (2012) ===
No. overall	No. in season	Title	Original release date	U.S. viewers (millions)
0	0	"Casting Special"	October 9, 2012	1.00
Meet 14 amazing dancers and their moms from around the country when they arrive in Los Angeles for the chance of a lifetime, the final audition of Abby's Ultimate Dance Competition. In an intense rehearsal, the dancers must learn three different routines in only two hours. The finalists also get a chance to meet their judges, including "Lead Judge" Dance Moms' Abby Lee Miller, who is joined at the judges table by Robin Antin, founder of the Pussycat Doll's dance troupe, and celebrity choreographer Richard "Richy" Jackson. It all comes down to a double elimination and the pressure is on as the contestants must impress the judges if they want to make the cut
1	1	"Let the Dancing Begin"	October 9, 2012	1.11
When this life-changing competition kicks off the 12 finalists are tasked with their first live performance in front of judges including, Dance Moms' Abby Lee Miller, Robin Antin, founder of the Pussycat Doll's dance troupe and celebrity choreographer, Richard "Richy" Jackson. The dancers are split into trios and assigned routines with a "Hollywood" theme. As the contestants prepare throughout the week, the moms start sizing each other up. Alliances begin to form, but when one mom takes charge during rehearsal, the other moms realize that she could be trouble. Plus, one mother and daughter team reveal just how far they're willing to go to win the competition.
2	2	"Unleash the Monsters"	October 16, 2012	0.89
There are 11 dancers left and the theme for this week's competition is "Monsters of the Night." The theme proves to be very fitting as one mom bares her claws and strikes at another, who is using her divorce as a way to get attention. After witnessing that mom make one of the girls break into tears, two of the other mothers join forces and conjure up a demon, unleashing on the other mom claiming she is being fake. Also one of the girls wins the group dance challenge and gets a solo, but there must be a full moon because she brings out the beast in her mother who refuses to listen to her daughter's suggestions.
3	3	"Get into Character"	October 23, 2012	1.11
This week, the 10 remaining dancers are assigned duets based on "American Extremes." One of the classically trained dancers struggles during her hip-hop duet. Meanwhile, another contestant's role in the group dance forces her to share painful memories with her fellow dancers. Plus, one mother's meddling threatens to send a team home.
4	4	"In a New York Minute"	October 30, 2012	0.89
The nine remaining dancers are thrilled when they learn the theme for this week's performance is "Broadway." But when two mothers at odds team up, everyone prepares for the worst. Meanwhile, one dancer struggles with the hip-hop trio and when the judges can't decide who should go home, that can mean only one thing — a dance-off.
5	5	"Sabotage"	November 6, 2012	0.98
After winning the right to pick all the dance assignments for the week, one mother takes this week's skill, survival, to heart. Her strategy to sabotage the other dancers by putting them in their weakest areas creates discord amongst the mothers who feel betrayed by her actions. Meanwhile, one dancer struggles with her technique while ignoring her mother's corrections, which threatens to turn their dance into a real disaster. And, one pair must overcome their physical differences in order to become the perfect dancing machines.
6	6	"Dancing Through the Decades"	November 13, 2012	0.97
With only seven dancers left in the competition, the pressure is at a fever-pitch. One mom is overwhelmed as she deals with competition demands as well as personal problems. Meanwhile, one dancer struggles with confidence issues as she tackles her very first solo of the competition.
7	7	"Happily Never After"	November 20, 2012	1.11
It's Witches, Wolves and Wicked Stepmothers, this week when the dancers enter the land of fairy tales. But for one mother and daughter, their fantasy of being the ultimate dancer comes to an end. Meanwhile another dancer struggles with becoming the evil Stepmother. Plus an injury during rehearsal could spell disaster for another mother and daughter duo.
8	8	"Bend It Like Abby"	November 27, 2012	1.05
The final five dancers must be very flexible this week as they try to master dance styles from around the world. One dancer starts some drama that quickly goes global after she tells her mother she overheard other dancers saying she wished she had been eliminated. Another dancer struggles to connect with the history of the people that inspired her routine. And, the bottom two dancers must undergo a flexibility test to stay in the competition.
9	9	"Cirque du Solos"	December 4, 2012	1.35
With only four dancers remaining in the competition, the moms have to do whatever it takes to ensure their child makes it to the final three. This week the girls not only have to worry about perfecting their solos, but they're also doing a complicated and grueling circus inspired group dance.
10	10	"Dance for Your Life"	December 11, 2012	1.54
Only three dancers remain for the grueling final round of this life changing competition. With $100,000 and a scholarship to the Joffrey School of Ballet in New York on the line, the three remaining girls must dance for their lives. But they're not alone. Former contestants and their moms make a surprise return for one last performance. It all comes down to the two-hour finale when Abby will reveal her first Ultimate Dancer.

=== Season 2 (2013) ===
No. overall	No. in season	Title	Original release date	U.S. viewers (millions)
11	1	"Make It Count!"	September 3, 2013	1.28
With 11 of the country's most promising young dancers selected from more than 1,000 national title holders, this season of Abby's Ultimate Dance Competition is back and bigger and better than ever. The performers are all vying for a $100,000 cash prize and a scholarship to the Young Dancers Program at the Joffrey Ballet School in New York. This week's theme is "Fame," as they gear up for their first performance in front of judges Abby Lee Miller, Broadway star Rachelle Rak and celebrity choreographer Richard "Richy" Jackson. Alliances begin to form and the dance floor heats up as the youngest contestant rubs one of the moms the wrong way.
12	2	"Dare to Be You"	September 10, 2013	1.45
With this week's competition theme as "Dare to be You," all the dances are inspired by Lady Gaga. Under the eyes of this week's challenge choreographer Richy Jackson, the young competitors struggle to embrace their own originality. The moms crack down hard on the dancers, encouraging them to "bring it" to the dance floor and one young dancer comes close to breaking down when she can't remember her routine. When one mom throws another mom under the bus, things get ugly.
13	3	"Gods and Mortals"	September 17, 2013	1.23
Abby is the dance goddess of the week and the dancers strive to attain dance immortality when the theme is "Gods and Mortals." There are ten dancers left and the performers in last week's bottom group struggle to prove that they deserve to be in the competition. The skill is "Power" and this week's challenge winner is Ally and she is allowed to make all the dance assignments and quickly discover holding the power isn't always easy. Melanie gets extreme when she overhears the others mothers talking about her daughter's weaknesses.
14	4	"Vegas Show Stoppers"	September 24, 2013	0.91
"Las Vegas" is this week's theme and the remaining dancers are tested with styles they've never encountered before. One mom finally snaps and takes on Abby after she gives one too many criticisms about her daughter. With the pressure of the surprise immunity reward building, tempers between the moms reach a boiling point.
15	5	"Anything Can Happen"	October 1, 2013	1.04
Abby decides to mix things up with the theme for the week being "Unconventional." Anything can, and will happen, starting with the remaining dancers battling Abby in a martial arts challenge. The winner's mom gets to decide which dancers land in the bottom three, leading to new fights and some surprise allegiances. To complicate matters further, each dance involves a giant, and sometimes unpredictable, prop.
16	6	"Broadway Backstabbers"	October 8, 2013	1.10
Judge Rachelle Rak, a veteran of "The Great White Way," leads the challenge for the "Broadway" themed week and blows the kids and moms away with her sassy moves. The challenge winner's mom earns the animosity of the others by bragging about her child. The pressure is on for the dancer who chooses the first solo of the season.
17	7	"Fairytales Come to Life"	October 15, 2013	1.06
The reward for the challenge this week is a private lesson with Abby Lee Miller herself, which some of the kids desperately wants to win... while others would do anything not to. The pressure of the competition has the moms harping on their children and one mom even sells out her own kid to the judges for not working hard enough.
18	8	"Wild West Showdown"	October 22, 2013	1.06
The theme of the week is "Wild West". Animosity begins to build toward one dancer. A mother demands that her child get a solo.
19	9	"Your Worst Nightmare"	October 29, 2013	1.08
The theme of this week is "Nightmares. One mother tries to sabotage another with dance assignments. Some of the dancers begin to turn on their mothers.
20	10	"Divas in the House"	November 5, 2013	1.23
The children choose their dance styles. One unlucky dancer must perform a dance style that no one else wanted.
21	11	"Down the Rabbit Hole"	November 12, 2013	1.28
The week's theme is "Alice in Wonderland". One mother sabotages the other dancers. The dancers strive to make it to the final three.
22	12	"Meet Abby's Newest Ultimate Dancer"	November 19, 2013	1.34
Note: After the finale, Lifetime said AUDC will be renewed for a third season.

== Progress table ==
A recap of both seasons.

=== Season 1 (2012) ===
Rank		Episode										
#	Dancer	CS	1	2	3	4	5	6	7	8	9	10
1	Brianna	SAFE	TOP	SAFE	SAFE	SAFE	SAFE	TOP	TOP	**TOP**	BTM2	WINNER
2	Madison	SAFE	TOP	TOP	SAFE	BTM3	SAFE	SAFE	**SAFE**	SAFE	SAFE	**SECOND**
3	Asia	BTM2	SAFE	BTM4	BTM2	SAFE	TOP	**SAFE**	BTM2	BTM2	TOP	THIRD
4	Amanda C.	BTM3	SAFE	SAFE	SAFE	**TOP**	SAFE	TOP	SAFE	TOP	**ELIM**	
5	Jordyn	TOP	SAFE	**BTM2**	TOP	TOP	BTM3	TOP	TOP	ELIM		
6	Hadley	TOP	SAFE	TOP	TOP	SAFE	**BTM2**	BTM2	ELIM			
7	Lexine	SAFE	SAFE	SAFE	**SAFE**	TOP	TOP	ELIM				
8	Elisabeth	SAFE	**BTM3**	SAFE	SAFE	BTM3	ELIM					
9	Lennon (known as Zack)	SAFE	SAFE	TOP	SAFE	ELIM						
10	Tua	SAFE	BTM2	BTM3	ELIM							
11	Kyleigh Jai	SAFE	SAFE	ELIM								
12	Tessa	BTM4	ELIM									
13	Amanda K.	ELIM										
14	Nicole	ELIM										

Bold means the dancer was the challenge winner that week.

The dancer won Abby's Ultimate Dance Competition.
The dancer came in second place in Abby's Ultimate Dance Competition.
The dancer came in third place in Abby's Ultimate Dance Competition.
The dancer received high critiques and one of the best performances of the evening based on the judges decision and advanced.
The dancer advanced to the next episode without being in the bottom or being one of the top performers.
The dancer received low critiques and was at risk, but did not land in the bottom and advanced.
The dancer landed in the bottom two and was at risk for elimination.
The dancer was eliminated from Abby's Ultimate Dance Competition.
The dancer was eliminated in a previous episode and is no longer competing.

=== Season 2 (2013) ===
Rank		Episode											
#	Dancer	1	2	3	4	5	6	7	8	9	10	11	12
1	McKaylee	SAFE	BTM3	TOP	TOP	BTM3	**TOP**	SAFE	SAFE	**TOP**	TOP	BTM3	**WINNER**
2	Gianna	BTM3	**TOP**	BTM3	TOP	TOP	SAFE	BTM2	BTM3	TOP	SAFE	**TOP**	SECOND
3	Trinity	**BTM4**	BTM5	TOP	**IMM**	**SAFE**	TOP	SAFE	**TOP**	SAVE	TOP	BTM3	THIRD
4	Kalani	SAFE	TOP	BTM2	SAVE	TOP	BTM4	**SAFE**	TOP	BTM2	**BTM2**	BTM3	FOURTH
5	JoJo	SAFE	TOP	SAFE	BTM3	SAFE	BTM3	TOP	BTM2	BTM3	ELIM		
6	Travis	SAFE	SAFE	TOP	SAFE	SAFE	BTM2	SAFE	ELIM				
7	Ally	SAFE	BTM4	**SAFE**	BTM2	BTM2	TOP	ELIM					
8	Tyler	SAFE	SAFE	SAFE	BTM4	SAFE	ELIM						
9	Haley	BTM2	BTM2	SAFE	TOP	ELIM							
10	Chloe	SAFE	SAVE	ELIM									
11	Sarina	ELIM											

Bold means the dancer was the challenge winner that week.

The dancer won Abby's Ultimate Dance Competition.
The dancer came in second place in Abby's Ultimate Dance Competition.
The dancer came in third place in Abby's Ultimate Dance Competition.
The dancer was eliminated before the finale and came in fourth place in Abby's Ultimate Dance Competition.
The dancer received high critiques and one of the best performances of the evening based on the judges decision and advanced.
The dancer had immunity from the elimination.
The dancer advanced to the next episode without being in the bottom three or being one of the top performers.
The dancer received low critiques and was at risk, but did not land in the bottom and advanced.
The dancer landed in the bottom two and was at risk for elimination.
The dancer was eliminated but was saved by one of the judges by using their Call Back Card.
The dancer was eliminated from Abby's Ultimate Dance Competition.
The dancer was eliminated in a previous episode and is no longer competing.
