= Literati (book club) =

Subscription service in Austin, Texas, US

- Company type: Children's Book Club, subscription service
- Headquarters: Austin, Texas, United States
- CEO: Jessica Ewing
- Website: www.literati.com
- Launched: December 2016; 9 years ago

Literati is an Austin-based children's book club and subscription service. The company sends monthly boxes to subscribers, with books organized by age and reading level. Literati was co-founded in 2016 by CEO Jessica Ewing.

== History ==
Literati is an Austin-based children's book club and subscription service. It launched at the end of 2016. For a recurring membership fee, Literati sends a box of five books to subscribers every month. Boxes are organized by age for children from newborn to age 12.

In October 2019, Literati raised $12 million in a Series A round of funding. In January 2021, the company raised $40 million in a Series B round of funding.

In 2020, Literati gave away thousands of books during the COVID-19 pandemic. The company partnered with different local and national organizations to make the donations. The first week of the donations, books were handed to parents as they came to AISD schools to pick up free curbside meals for their children.

=== Luminary Book Clubs ===
In August 2020, Literati started a line of celebrity book clubs for adult readers curated by “Luminaries” — authors and intellectuals. The initial Literati Luminaries include Richard Branson, Susan Orlean, Malala Yousafzai, Stephen Curry, and the Joseph Campbell Foundation.

=== Great Minds Edition ===
In November 2018, Literati featured a “Great Minds” edition featuring public figures such as Sheryl Sandberg, Melinda Gates, Sundar Pichai, Amy Tan, B. J. Novak, Anjali Forber-Pratt, Steven Pinker, and Maria Popova.
