= Industry Dance Awards =

American dance award ceremony

- Awarded for: Dance achievements
- Country: United States
- First award: 2012; 14 years ago
- Website: industrydanceawards.com

The Industry Dance Awards (IDAs) is an annual awards ceremony held in Hollywood, Los Angeles, recognizing accomplishments within the dance community and providing support to dancers and choreographers across various platforms. The awards are presented by Dancers Against Cancer (DAC), a nonprofit organization founded in 2012 to provide financial assistance to dance educators, dancers, and their families affected by cancer.

Categories include Best Hip-Hop Performance, Best Jazz Performance, Best Open/Ballet/Acro, Best Tap, Best Lyrical, Best Novelty/Musical, People's Choice and Choreography of the Year.

In 2023, American actress and author Shirley MacLaine was honored with the Lifetime Achievement Award, while Radio City Rockette Jennifer Jones was the Dance Role Model Award recipient. The event took place at Avalon Hollywood and was attended by Cole Walliser, JoJo Siwa and Julianne Hough, among others.

The Industry Dance Awards is supported by a prestigious network of dance competitions and conventions that celebrate growth and excellence. Partnering dance competitions and conventions include Applause Talent, Beyond The Stars Dance Competition, Breakout Dance Competition, Energy, Groove Dance Competition, High Voltage Dance Competition, KAR Dance Competition, Leap National Dance Competition, Masquerade, Rainbow Dance Competition, Reverb Dance Competition, Spotlight Dance Cup, Turn it UP Dance Challenge, and Ultra Dance Tour.
