= Abby Lee Miller =

American dance instructor (born 1965)

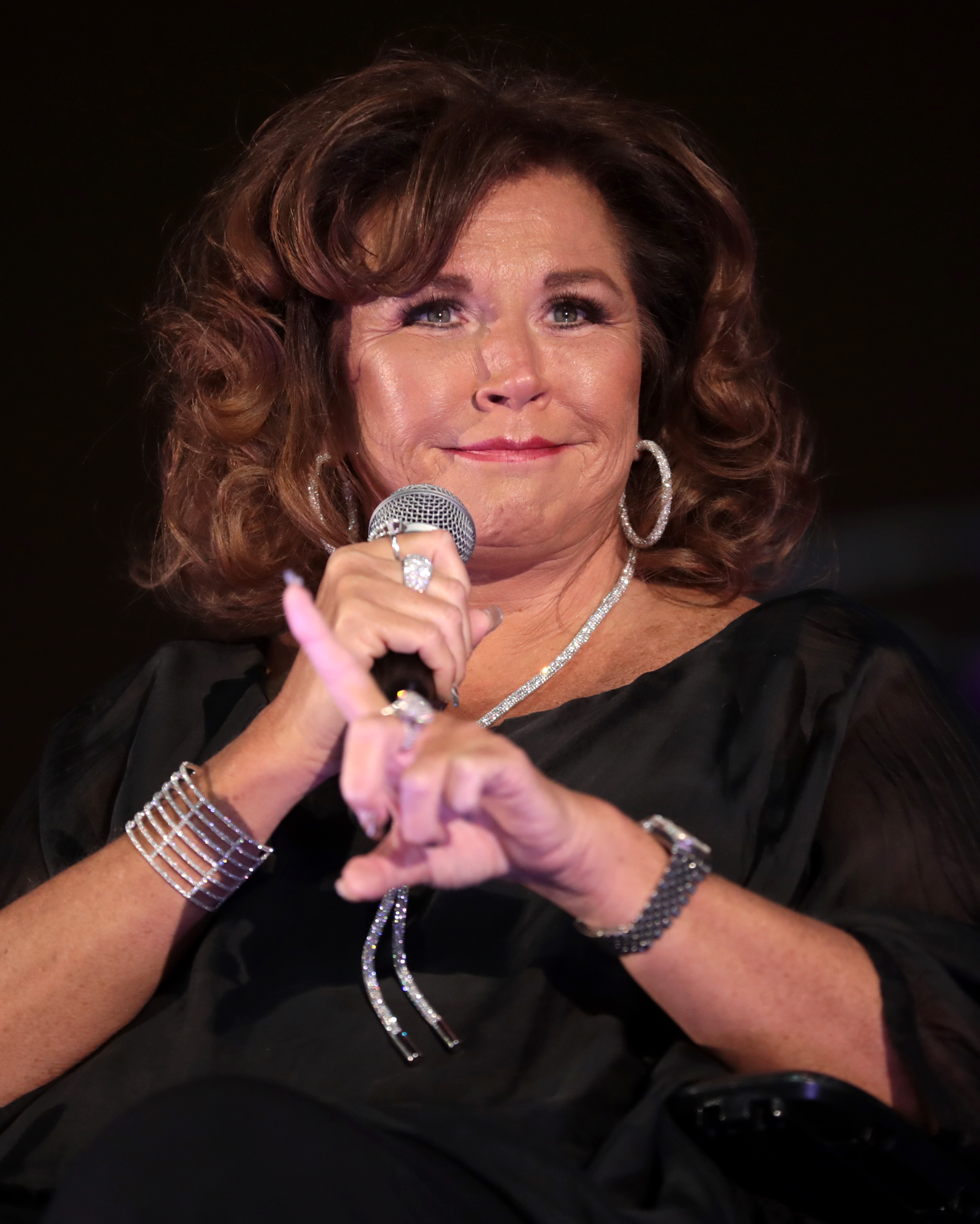
- Miller in 2022
- Born: Abigale Lee Miller; September 21, 1965 (age 61); Pittsburgh, Pennsylvania, U.S.
- Occupations: Dance instructor; choreographer; television personality
- Years active: 1980–present
- Television: Dance Moms; Abby's Ultimate Dance Competition

Abigale Lee Miller (born September 21, 1965) is an American dance instructor, choreographer, and television personality. With a career in dance instruction and choreography spanning over four decades, Miller established the Abby Lee Dance Company (ALDC) in Pennsylvania in the late 1980s. Miller's studio became the subject of the Lifetime reality series Dance Moms (2011–2019). The show's success prompted Miller to receive subsequent notoriety and spin-off shows of her own: Abby's Ultimate Dance Competition (2012–13) and Abby's Studio Rescue (2014).

== Early life ==
Abby Lee Miller was born in Pittsburgh, Pennsylvania, on September 21, 1965, to Maryen Lorrain Miller (née McKay; 1927–2014), a dance teacher and studio owner, and George L. "Salty" Miller (1927–2000), a railroad yardmaster.

== Career ==
Miller grew up around dance in Penn Hills, Pennsylvania, studying under her mother's direction at the Maryen Lorrain Dance Studio. In 1980, when she was just 14, Miller formed the Abby Lee Dance Company, a dance team at her mother's studio. Miller eventually took over the studio in 1995, and renamed it Reign Dance Productions. Miller became certified by Dance Masters of America (DMA) and became a member of Dance Masters of Pennsylvania Chapter #10 in 1986. When she was 22, Miller obtained a $540,000 loan to construct her own studio in Pittsburgh.

In 2011, Miller began appearing in the Lifetime reality television show Dance Moms, which followed Miller and her dance team as they traveled nationally to compete in dance competitions. Notably, Miller's dance team has consisted of Maddie and Mackenzie Ziegler, Chloe Lukasiak, Nia Sioux, JoJo Siwa, Brynn Rumfallo, Elliana Walmsley, and Lilliana Ketchman. Miller's teaching methods and often abrasive demeanor were criticized by her students' mothers and viewers alike; fellow dancers and choreographers Derek Hough and Mark Ballas publicly disapproved of Miller's methodology in February 2012 via Twitter, with both calling it abusive. Her appearance on the show also led to the termination of her membership from DMA that same month, as DMA national president Phyllis R. Guy called it "a total misrepresentation of our dance educators and their students and is detrimental to the dance profession." Also that month, in an appearance on The View, Miller defended her teachings, saying "Some kids you have to yell at. Some kids you have to take a baseball bat, which is foam rubber by the way, and straighten that knee," as Whoopi Goldberg compared Miller to Béla Károlyi.

Despite criticism, Dance Moms continued to be a success; maintaining a viewership of 2.16 million for its second season. In 2012, Miller received her own spin-off, Abby's Ultimate Dance Competition, which ran for two seasons and 22 episodes. In 2014, Lifetime produced Miller's second spin-off, Abby's Studio Rescue. The latter ran for only seven episodes. In May, she was a guest judge on Dancing with the Stars. In July, Miller published her book, Everything I Learned about Life, I Learned in Dance Class. In September, Miller announced she would be extending the Abby Lee Dance Company by relocating her primary dance studio to Los Angeles, with the Pittsburgh location still operative.

Miller opened her Los Angeles studio, Abby Lee Dance Company LA, in June 2015, with the show's production following suit as it entered its fifth season. In 2016, Miller appeared in the season four premiere episode of The Eric Andre Show. The same year, amidst ongoing legal issues, Miller's engagement in both teaching and the show's production dwindled, as Aisha Francis was brought in to temporarily take over choreography. In March 2017, Miller announced she had quit the series in an Instagram post. With production for the seventh season underway, professional dancer Cheryl Burke was subsequently brought in as Miller's replacement. In July, in light of Miller's prison sentence, Abby Lee Dance Company LA permanently closed after only two years of operations. While incarcerated, Sharknado 5: Global Swarming premiered in August, in which she portrayed NATO scientist Dr. Bramble.

Upon her release from prison in May 2018, Miller announced her return for season 8 of Dance Moms in July. Dance Moms: Resurrection premiered June 4, 2019, on Lifetime. Miller has since relocated her LA studio to a much smaller space, which includes a single dance room and a merchandise shop. On May 4, 2020, Miller announced via Instagram that she would be leaving Dance Moms and Lifetime after nine years.

In December 2022, The New York Post reported that Miller had sold her original Pittsburgh studio for $300,000 and would be repurposed into a bus lot and daycare. Miller confirmed the selling the following month, saying in an Instagram video, "I didn't sell my name. I didn't sell my brand. I didn't sell my life's work. I sold brick, mortar, cinder blocks and an amazing dance floor that is still in mint condition."

In June 2023, Miller started hosting the Leave It On The Dance Floor Podcast, where she talks about her time on Dance Moms. In September, Miller began appearing in the digital series Mad House, which premiered on the streaming service Brandon TV. The second season premiered on February 27, 2025.

== Controversies ==
On June 2, 2020, Miller posted a black square to Instagram on Blackout Tuesday in response to the murders of George Floyd, Ahmaud Arbery, and Breonna Taylor. This caused Adriana Smith, the mother of Dance Moms season 8 dancer Kamryn, to share on Instagram that she and her daughter left the show because of their experience with Miller. "A statement from her that sticks in my mind to this day during my time on DMS8 is 'I know you grew up in the HOOD with only a box of 8 crayons, but I grew up in the Country Club with a box of 64—don't be stupid.'" Smith wrote on Instagram. On June 3, 2020, another Dance Moms mother, Camille Bridges, accused Miller of treating her daughter Camryn differently because of her race and that the environment was "extremely hostile". She told E! News via e-mail that Miller "tried to spin Camryn as being the poor one and there on scholarship. She would say the most terrible things on camera. It was a traumatic experience that I wish on no one."

Miller has since deleted her Black Lives Matter post and on June 4, 2020, she issued an apology to "Kamryn, Adriana, and anyone else I've hurt", saying, "I realize that racism can come not just from hate, but also from ignorance. No matter the cause, it is harmful, and it is my fault. While I cannot change the past or remove the harm I have done, I promise to educate myself, learn, grow, and do better. While I hope to one day earn your forgiveness, I recognize that words alone are not enough. I understand it takes time and genuine change." Reposting Miller's apology, Smith said that she did not accept it because she did not think it was sincere. "I also fully support and standby Nia Frazier [Sioux], Camryn and Nicaya [Wiley] as well as any others who have been victims of racism at the hands of Abby Lee Miller or in the industry," Smith wrote.

It was announced that on June 5, 2020, Lifetime decided to sever ties with Miller as a result of the allegations of the racist remarks she made. The network canceled the Abby's Virtual Dance-Off competition reality series, which was announced in April and was slated to debut in summer 2020. Miller also will not be returning to Dance Moms if the series is renewed for a ninth season.

== Personal life ==
Miller has never been married and does not have any children. She has been quoted as saying that she "loved the studio more than family".

On December 4, 2010, Miller filed for bankruptcy after owing more than $400,000 in back taxes to the IRS.

On April 13, 2018, Miller was admitted to Cedars-Sinai Marina Hospital. The day after she was admitted to the hospital, her blood pressure rapidly began to drop and her kidneys began to fail. Due to complications in an subsequent emergency spinal surgery, Miller was temporarily paralyzed from the neck down. She was diagnosed with Burkitt lymphoma, a type of non-Hodgkin's lymphoma cancer. In September of that year, Miller's lymphoma went into remission and she began physical therapy to relearn how to walk. In May 2019, Miller confirmed she was in remission and cancer-free.

=== Legal issues and incarceration ===
Miller began to encounter numerous legal problems in 2014. Former cast member Kelly Hyland sued Miller, charging assault. The suit further claims the show's producers encourage a violent and combative atmosphere on the show as a way to attract viewers. A $5 million lawsuit was filed against Collins Avenue Entertainment for staging disagreements that ended in a fight between Hyland and Miller. Hyland's daughter and former cast member Paige Hyland also filed an emotional distress lawsuit against Miller for $5 million. The claims were dropped on the emotional distress lawsuit. Some indignities Miller inflicted upon her students that the lawsuit highlighted included bullying, throwing a chair at a student, pinching a student until she bled, and referring to a student of color as a "little tootie" (in reference to Tootie Ramsey from The Facts of Life).

On October 13, 2015, Miller was indicted by the DOJ for fraud for creating a secret bank account between 2012 and 2013 used to hide income from masterclasses, TV deals, and merchandise sales, in addition to failing to file required monthly reports of income with the bankruptcy court for 13 months. She was indicted for bankruptcy fraud, concealment of bankruptcy assets and false bankruptcy declarations in hiding some $755,000. If found guilty, she could have faced a fine of $250,000 for each of the 20 counts she was indicted on (collectively $5,000,000) and five years in prison. She pleaded not guilty in November 2015. By February 2016, the case was delayed a fifth time. Shortly after her indictment, she was charged with customs fraud relating to undeclared cash from Dance Moms Australia master class tour. Miller reached a deal with the IRS criminal investigators to plead guilty to reduced charges on June 27, 2016.

Sentencing was originally set for October 11, 2016. It was postponed three times: first to January 20, 2017, then to February 24, and finally to May 8. On May 9, after a two-day hearing, Miller was sentenced to one year and a day in federal prison, followed by two years of supervised release. Miller also paid a $40,000 fine, a $120,000 judgment and gave a DNA sample relating to her felony charge. On July 12, Miller reported to the Victorville Federal Correctional Institution in Victorville, California, to begin serving her prison sentence. On March 27, 2018, Miller was transferred to a Long Beach, California halfway house to complete her sentence. After receiving time off for good behavior, she was released on May 25.
