= Nia Sioux =

American media personality (born 2001)

- Sioux in 2016
- Born: Nia Sioux Frazier; June 20, 2001 (age 25); Pittsburgh, Pennsylvania
- Occupations: Dancer, actress, singer, social media personality, author

Instagram information
- Page: Nia Sioux
- Followers: 5.6 million

TikTok information
- Page: Nia Sioux
- Followers: 9.8 million

YouTube information
- Channel: Nia Sioux
- Subscribers: 1.27 million
- Views: 115 million
- Last updated: November 17, 2026

Nia Sioux Frazier (born June 20, 2001) is an American actress, singer, social media influencer and dancer. She initially gained attention for appearing on the Lifetime reality television series Dance Moms from 2011 to 2017. Following the series, Sioux has appeared in various acting projects including portraying Emma Barber on the CBS soap opera The Bold and the Beautiful and appearances in various off-Broadway stage productions. Sioux has also released various singles, as well as publishing a memoir, Bottom of the Pyramid (2025).

== Early and personal life ==
Nia Sioux Frazier was born on June 20, 2001. She was born in Pittsburgh, Pennsylvania, to Holly and Evan Frazier, and has two brothers. As a young child, she began training in dance at the Abby Lee Dance Company. Whilst there, she was diagnosed with complex regional pain syndrome but continued dancing.

Whilst continuing her professional projects, Sioux studied American Literature and Culture at the University of California (UCLA), graduating in 2024.

== Career ==
Aged nine, Sioux was cast alongside her mother on the Lifetime reality television series Dance Moms. Her parents were hesitant for her to appear on the series since they worked full-time and were caring for three children. They also did not believe Dance Moms would amount to much and liked to stay away from drama. The beginning of each episode typically featured dance coach Abby Lee Miller unveiling her personal ranking of the dancers on her competition team, known as the "pyramid". Sioux became known for usually being ranked at the bottom of the pyramid and being given less solos and opportunities than other cast members. She appeared in seven seasons of Dance Moms from 2011 to 2017, with Sioux and her mother becoming the longest-serving cast members. Sioux pursued music alongside dance whilst appearing on the series, notably releasing singles including "Star in Your Own Life" and "Slay", the latter of which featured Coco Jones.

In 2016 Sioux appeared as a dancer in the off-Broadway production Trip of Love. Following leaving Dance Moms in 2017, Sioux joined the cast of the CBS soap opera The Bold and the Beautiful. She was cast in the regular role of Emma Barber and appeared from 2018 to 2019. Also in 2018, she appeared as a correspondent for NBC at the Winter Olympics in South Korea, as well as making her film debut in Runnin' From My Roots. Then from 2019 to 2020, she starred in Brat TV's Sunnyside Up. 2021 saw Sioux star in the drama film Imperfect High, as well as The Code.

In 2024 Sioux appeared in a string of films including musical Mean Girls, The Lies I Tell Myself and thriller The Lady of the Lake: The Legend of Lake Ronkonkoma, as well as starring in Saving Nora, a miniseries. Also in 2024, Sioux published a memoir titled Bottom of the Pyramid, which she wrote whilst in her junior year at UCLA. The memoir details her experiences on Dance Moms, particularly with Miller, with whom she alleges she had various racist encounters. She then appeared as a dancer in Shuffle of Love: A Descendants Short Story (2025). 2026 saw Sioux return to the stage in the off-Broadway production of 11 to Midnight. Later that year, she appeared in a featured ensemble role in Mean Girls at Pittsburgh Civic Light Opera, having previously appeared in the 2024 film.

== Filmography ==
=== Film ===
Year	Title	Role	Notes
2018	Runnin' From My Roots	Zoe Whitfield	
2020	Zombies 2: The Collab	Willa	Short film
2021	The Code	Sonitas	
2024	Mean Girls	Social Media Friend	
2024	The Lies I Tell Myself	Ally	
2024	The Lady of the Lake	Jamie Schultz	
2025	Shuffle of Love: A Descendants Short Story	Dancer	Short film

=== Television ===
Year	Title	Role	Notes
2011–2017	Dance Moms	Herself	Main role (season 1–7)
2018–2019	The Bold and the Beautiful	Emma Barber	59 episodes
2019	The JoJo & BowBow Show Show	Kyra (voice)	3 episodes
2019	The JoJo & BowBow Show Show	Hamela (voice)	3 episodes
2019–2020	Sunnyside Up	Lily McKay	Main role
2021	Imperfect High	Hanna Brooks	Television film
2024	Saving Nora	Nora Smith	Main role

== Discography ==
=== Singles ===
List of singles as lead artist, showing year released
Title	Year	Album
"Star in Your Own Life"	2015	Non-album singles
"Slay" (featuring Coco Jones)	2015	Non-album singles
"Down"	2016	Non-album singles
"DJ Fav"	2016	High Strung
"Winner"	2016	Non-album singles
"Dance (Just Rock)"	2017	Non-album singles
"You Don't Really Wanna"	2017	Non-album singles
"Lose My Mind"	2019	Non-album singles
"Girl Code"	2019	Non-album singles
"Low Key Love"	2020	Non-album singles
"Imma Catch" (with Jake Clark)	2024	Non-album singles

== Stage ==
Year	Title	Role	Venue	Ref.
2016	Trip of Love	Dancer	Stage 42	
2026	11 to Midnight	Dancer	Orpheum Theatre	
2026	Mean Girls	Dancer	Pittsburgh Civic Light Opera	

== Bibliography ==
- Bottom of the Pyramid. Harper Horizon. November 4, 2025. ISBN 978-1400253043.
