= JackEL discography =

This is the discography of JackEL (born September 9, 1996, Jack Edward Lozeron), a Canadian DJ, record producer and songwriter. He is most notable for a collaboration with Skip Martin on an album titled EDM Lounge. He has released one album, three EP's and dozens of singles.

== Albums ==
| Title | Released | Label |
|---|---|---|
| EDM Lounge (with Skip Martin) | 2019 | FVYDID |

== EPs ==
| Title | Released | Label |
|---|---|---|
| Breathe Easy | 2017 | FVYDID |
| Rootz (Remixes) | 2017 | FVYDID |
| We Belong Remix EP | 2022 | Speed House Movement |

== Selected singles ==
| Title | Year | Album |
|---|---|---|
| "Too Young to Die" (featuring Mims) | 2008 | Non-album single |
| "Crazy" (featuring Ras Kronik) | 2015 | Non-album single |
| "Just Fine" (with ZaZa Maree) | 2016 | Non-album single |
| "Night Bass" | 2016 | Non-album single |
| "Breathe Easy" (featuring Skip Martin) | 2017 | Breathe Easy (EP) |
| "Change the World" (with JTruthPA) | | Non-album single |
| "Girlfriend" | 2017 | Non-album single |
| "Late Summer" (with BRB) | 2017 | Non-album single |
| "Move" (featuring Skip Martin) | 2017 | Non-album single |
| "Rootz" (featuring General Jah Mikey) (with RV3RS) | 2017 | Non-album single |
| "Winds of Change" (with Trice Be Phantom Magnetiq) | | Non-album single |
| "Imagination" (JackEL Remix) (with Foster the People) | 2019 | Non-album single |
| "3 Nights" (JackEL Remix) (with Dominic Fike) | 2019 | Non-album single |
| "High as a Mafk" (with JAYKØ and Steezy Wundr) | 2019 | Non-album single |
| "Viens" (with Costly & SpaceCadet) | 2019 | Non-album single |
| "Upgrade It" (VIP Mix) (with 263) | 2020 | Non-album single |
| "Pain (VIP)" (with Merdix Antwinette) | 2020 | Non-album single |
| "Habits & Control" (with Merdix Antwinette and Bobby Duque) | 2020 | Non-album single |
| "NØ MØRE" (featuring Trice Be) (with Anthony Oak) | 2020 | Non-album single |
| "All Alone (I Need Another)" (with D.R.U) | 2020 | Non-album single |
| "Get This Right" (with Bobby Duque and Britt Lari) | 2020 | Non-album single |
| "Do It Again" (with RV3RS and Zaddy Babby) | 2021 | Non-album single |
| "Eyes" | 2021 | Non-album single |
| "Feel the Love" | 2021 | Non-album single |
| "Cutt the Check (VIP)" (with Slicklife) | 2021 | Non-album single |
| "Someone Real" (Remix) (with Jenna Jay) | 2021 | Non-album single |
| "Can Not Stop Me" (with Androjinni) | 2021 | Non-album single |
| "Déjà Vu" | 2022 | Non-album single |
| "Secrets" (JackEL Remix) (with DJ Susan) | 2021 | Non-album single |
| "Love Takeover" | 2022 | Non-album single |
| "What You Want" | 2022 | Non-album single |
| "We Belong" | 2022 | Non-album single |
| "Feel Something, Anything at All" | 2022 | Non-album single |
| "Happy Fucking Holiday" (with Yo Quiero Silla) | 2022 | Non-album single |
| "All I Wanna Do" | 2023 | Non-album single |
| "Fly Away" | 2023 | Non-album single |
| "Heaven or Hell" | 2023 | Non-album single |
