= Baker Hotel (Mineral Wells, Texas) =

- U.S. National Register of Historic Places
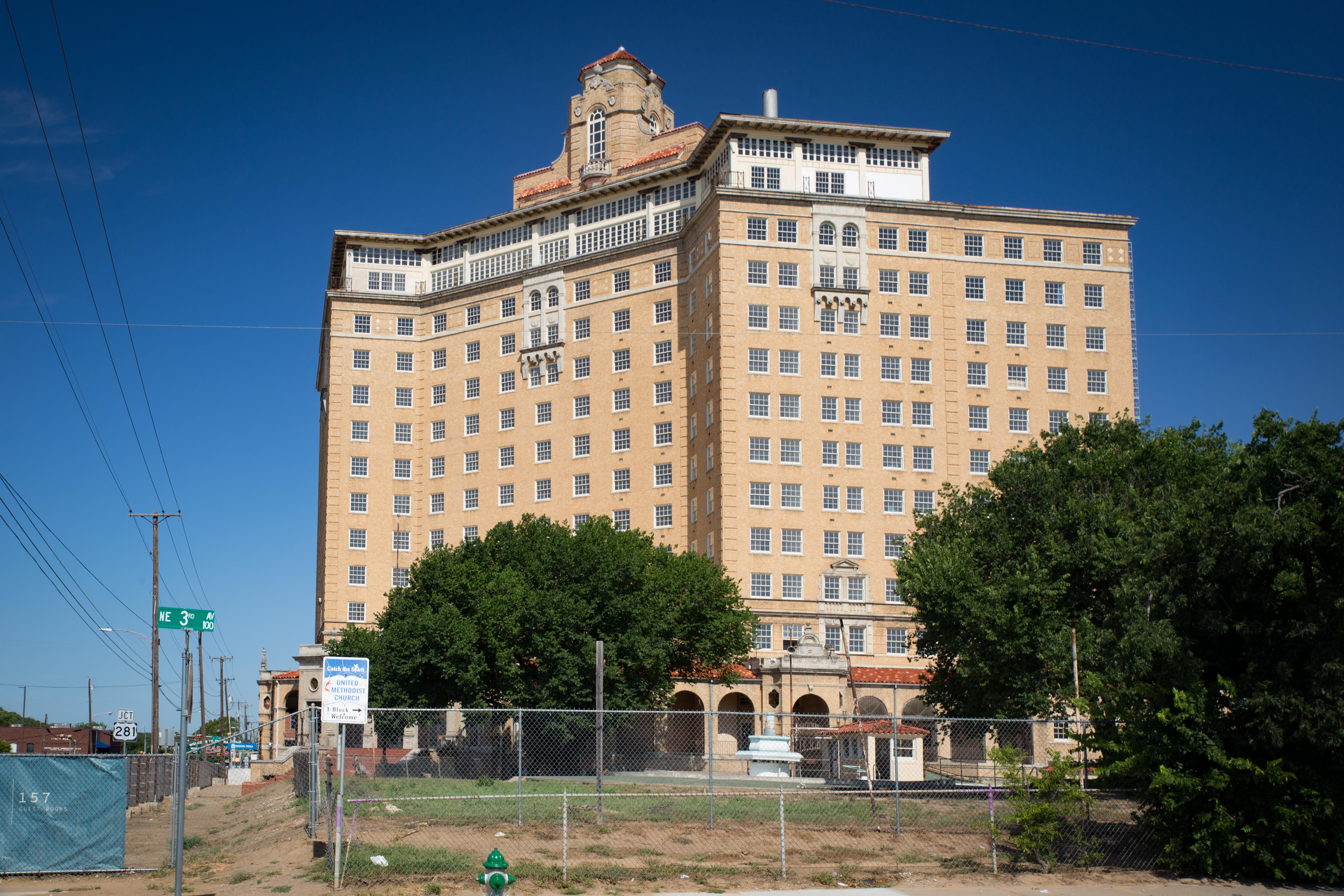
- The Baker Hotel in July 2023

- Location within Texas Location within the United States
- Location: 201 E. Hubbard St., Mineral Wells, Texas
- Coordinates: 32°48′34″N 98°6′41″W
- Area: less than one acre
- Built: 1929
- Built by: Inge & Burger, Inc.
- Architect: Wyatt C. Hedrick
- Architectural style: Chicago School; Mission Revival; Spanish Colonial Revival
- Website: https://thebakerhotelandspa.com
- NRHP reference No.: 82004518
- Added to NRHP: June 23, 1982

The Baker Hotel is a hotel in Mineral Wells, Texas. The Baker Hotel was placed on the National Register of Historic Places in 1982.

== History ==
=== Origin ===
The story of the Baker Hotel began in 1922, when citizens of Mineral Wells, concerned that noncitizens were profiting from the growing fame of the community's mineral water, raised $150,000 in an effort to build a large hotel facility owned by local shareholders. They solicited the services of prominent Texas hotel magnate Theodore Brasher Baker, who gained fame by designing and building such grand hotels as the Baker Hotel in Dallas and the Hotel Texas in Fort Worth, and managed the Connor Hotel in Joplin, Missouri.

Architect Wyatt C. Hedrick based the hotel design on the Arlington Hotel in Hot Springs, Arkansas, which was known for its water and baths. Construction began on the hotel in 1926, but was stopped after Mr. Baker made a trip to California, where he visited a hotel with a swimming pool, and decided the new Baker Hotel must have one in the front of the hotel. The swimming pool was placed on top of an already-completed basement, which was used as a work area for the hotel and a changing area for guests. An Olympic-sized pool to be filled with the curing mineral waters, it was the first swimming pool built at a hotel in the state of Texas.

Construction began the following year on the grand and opulent structure, which was described by Palo Pinto County historian John Winters as a "Spanish Colonial Revival, Commercial Highrise." It would rise 14 stories over Mineral Wells, and house 450 guest rooms, two ballrooms, an in-house beauty shop, and other novelties such as a bowling alley, a gymnasium, and an outdoor swimming pool. Completed three years later with a cost of $1.2 million (equivalent to US$23,000,000 in 2025), the Baker Hotel, the tallest building in the city at the time of completion, instantly dominated the city skyline.

Several notable celebrities made the Baker Hotel a temporary home during their visits to the city's health spas; the star-studded guest list included Glenn Miller, Lawrence Welk, Clark Gable, Judy Garland, Roy Rogers, future U.S. President Lyndon B. Johnson, and even The Three Stooges. It is even rumored by local historians that legendary outlaws Bonnie Parker and Clyde Barrow may have spent a night or two at the Baker Hotel.

=== The 1930s: A Top-Tier Spa Destination ===
The Baker Hotel opened to the public on November 9, 1929, and celebrated with a grand-opening celebration gala two weeks later on November 22. It boasted extravagant creature comforts such as an advanced hydraulic system that circulated ice water to all 450 guest rooms, lighting and fans controlled by the door locks that shut off and on automatically when the guest left or arrived in their rooms, and a valet compartment where guests could deposit soiled laundry that was accessible by hotel staff without them ever even having to enter the guest's room. Though it opened mere days after the 1929 stock market crash, the Baker Hotel enjoyed immense success throughout the 1930s, largely due to Mineral Wells's growing reputation as a top-tier health spa destination.

T.B. Baker began to suffer financial difficulties in the early 1930s, eventually declaring bankruptcy in 1934. He passed control of the Baker Hotel to his nephew Earl Baker, who had served as the hotel's manager, as well as managing director of Baker's Gunter Hotel in San Antonio. Despite its owner's financial problems, the Baker Hotel continued to thrive throughout the mid-1930s.

As the decade came to a close, however, Mineral Wells's reputation as a health spa was in decline; advances in modern medication and the discovery of antibiotics such as penicillin began to lead local doctors, who had been encouraging patients to partake in the area's therapeutic waters, to invest more confidence in medicine.

=== The 1940s: War Brings Prosperity ===
Business at the Baker Hotel was suffering due to the belief that mineral water was no longer a therapeutic tool, until a second boom in the Baker's popularity began when Camp Wolters (the future Fort Wolters military base) opened nearby in October 1940. It was home to the largest infantry placement in World War II and the hotel enjoyed its greatest popularity and success as a result; throughout World War II, the transient and permanent population of Mineral Wells hovered near 30,000, a large number of them making their temporary homes in the Baker Hotel.

Shortly afterwards, the hotel had air conditioning installed all throughout the building, which attracted customers and made the Baker Hotel a top-notch convention attraction, offering a meeting capacity of 2,500 attendees, a remarkable number considering that Mineral Wells itself was home to only about 6,000 residents upon opening in 1929.

In 1946, one year after World War II ended, Camp Wolters was shut down, and nearby business (including the Baker Hotel) suffered as a result.

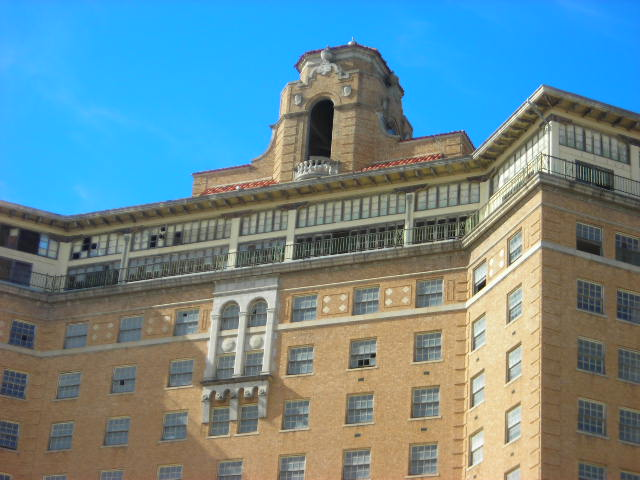
The Baker Hotel bell tower and ballroom

=== The 1950s–1970s: Decline and Abandonment ===
Photographed in 1993

A smaller renaissance came in 1951 when the camp was reopened as Fort Wolters, a military helicopter training base. The Baker Hotel hosted the Texas Republican Party conventions in 1952 and 1955, and the Texas Democratic Party held their convention at the Baker Hotel in 1954.

Aside from these successes, business declined steadily through the 1950s, and by the end of the decade, Earl Baker himself announced that he would be closing the hotel after his 70th birthday in 1963. True to his word, Baker shuttered the building on April 30, 1963, bringing an end to the Baker Hotel after 34 years of service to Mineral Wells and surrounding areas.

The hotel reopened two years later, in 1965, when a group of local investors leased the structure from the Baker family, but the revival was brief and marred by the sudden death of Earl Baker on December 3, 1967, after Baker suffered a massive heart attack at the hotel. He was found unconscious on the floor of the Baker Suite.

In 1972, the Baker Hotel closed its doors for the final time. Although several groups had made offers to rehabilitate the structure throughout the years, the building remained abandoned until June 2019, when it was announced that the Baker Hotel would finally be renovated and restored.

=== 2014: Baker Hotel Voting Measure ===
In May 2014, citizens of Mineral Wells approved a measure to allocate a portion of the city's sales tax to the renovation project that provided up to $4 million for the $65 million project. It was reported that nearly 96 percent of voters in Mineral Wells approved reallocating one-eighth of the city's sales tax to renovate the Baker Hotel in the near future. This money was saved by the local government and remained unused until it was announced that the Baker Hotel would be restored in June 2019.

=== 2019–present: Restoration Plans ===
On June 20, 2019, the Baker Hotel was announced to have been bought by Dallas-Fort Worth based investor Laird Fairchild along with other partners, who had secured the last of the funding needed for the restoration.

Plans were announced in August 2019 for the Baker Hotel Development Partners to purchase and reopen the Baker with a proposed renovation budget of $65 million. Plans call to enlarge the current 450 rooms and bring the total number of rooms down to 165. The second floor will still be maintained as a luxury mineral spa.

The $65 million renovation began in late 2019, though restoration was interrupted in March 2020 due to the COVID-19 pandemic and did not fully resume until May 2021, after a 14-month delay.

In May 2021, it was announced that the Baker Hotel was expected to reopen in fall 2024. However, in October 2022, the reopening was delayed to mid-2025, and in September 2023 it was announced that the reopening would again be delayed to spring 2026.

In July 2024, it was announced that restoration of the hotel had again been interrupted, this time due to developers needing to secure a $20 million or $25 million loan in order to continue construction (sources differ on the amount of the loan); it was also said that, if the loan is approved, the hotel will resume construction and would reopen either in late 2027 or at some point in 2028.

In November 2025, it was officially announced that, after a 16-month delay, restoration would resume and the reopening of Baker Hotel would again be delayed to 2028.

On April 28, 2026, a tornado (on a scale of EF3 according to the National Weather Service) struck Mineral Wells and the surrounding area. For the majority of the storm, wind speeds exceeded 100 miles per hour, resulting in several injuries as well as major damage across the region. On the Baker Hotel Instagram page, it was said that the tornado missed the hotel, but left many without homes and necessities.

On May 17, 2026, despite its ongoing restoration, the Baker Hotel hosted its first major event in more than 50 years, titled A Night for The Baker, which featured a dinner and performances from local musicians in the area. The event also highlighted the progress made in the restoration of the hotel, which is expected to open in 2028, and how the purpose of restoring the hotel is to revitalize both the hotel and the surrounding Mineral Wells region, which the town hopes can be accomplished by reopening the hotel to the public.

In late 2026, it was announced that the reopening of Baker Hotel would again be delayed to 2029, which would mark the 100th anniversary of the hotels' original opening in 1929.

== Trivia ==
The Baker Hotel was featured on the July 21, 2010 episode of Celebrity Ghost Stories with a story of actor Eric Balfour’s alleged paranormal experiences at the hotel. It was also featured on the December 7, 2012 episode of Ghost Adventures. The hotel was again featured on the September 10, 2016 episode of The Haunting of... Eric Balfour.

On March 25, 2022, Country Singer William Clark Green released an album "Baker Hotel".

In November 2023, the hotel was featured in a segment of Mysteries of the Abandoned, covering the history of the hotel, the lengthy time period in which it was abandoned, and what it currently looks like as renovations are ongoing.

In August 2025, the fictional novel, "White Dan for 200," by author Angela Wilson, was published by Mercury HeartLink Press (New Mexico). When a child, the author lived in the Baker Hotel prior to its closure, went to high school at Mineral Wells HS in the early 70s. The novel takes place in a fictional Texas town called Rupert, and its star hotel, the Porterfield Hotel, is based on both Mineral Wells, Texas and the Baker Hotel. Also referenced is the ghost hunting events that take place occasionally inside the hotel.

== Photo gallery ==
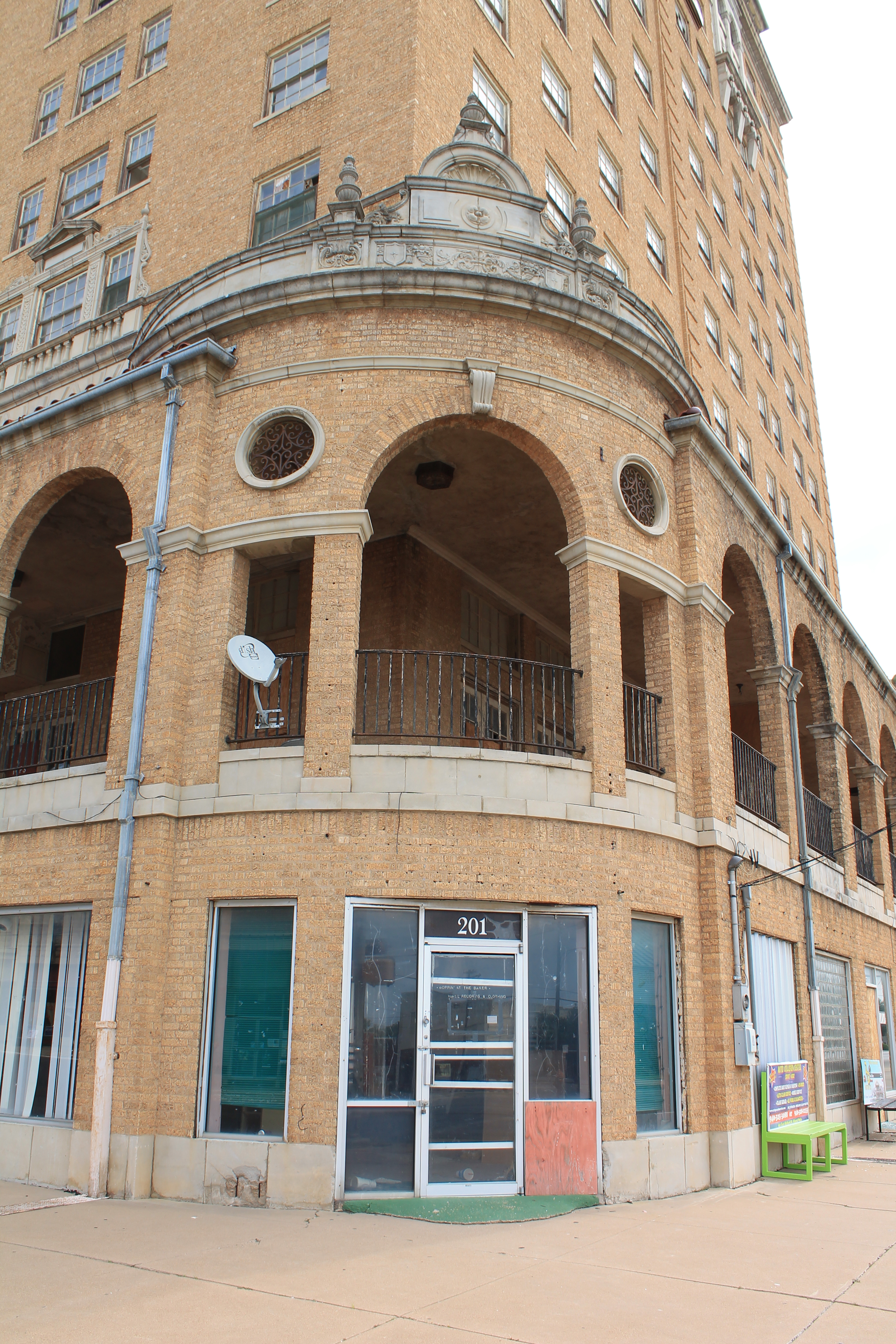

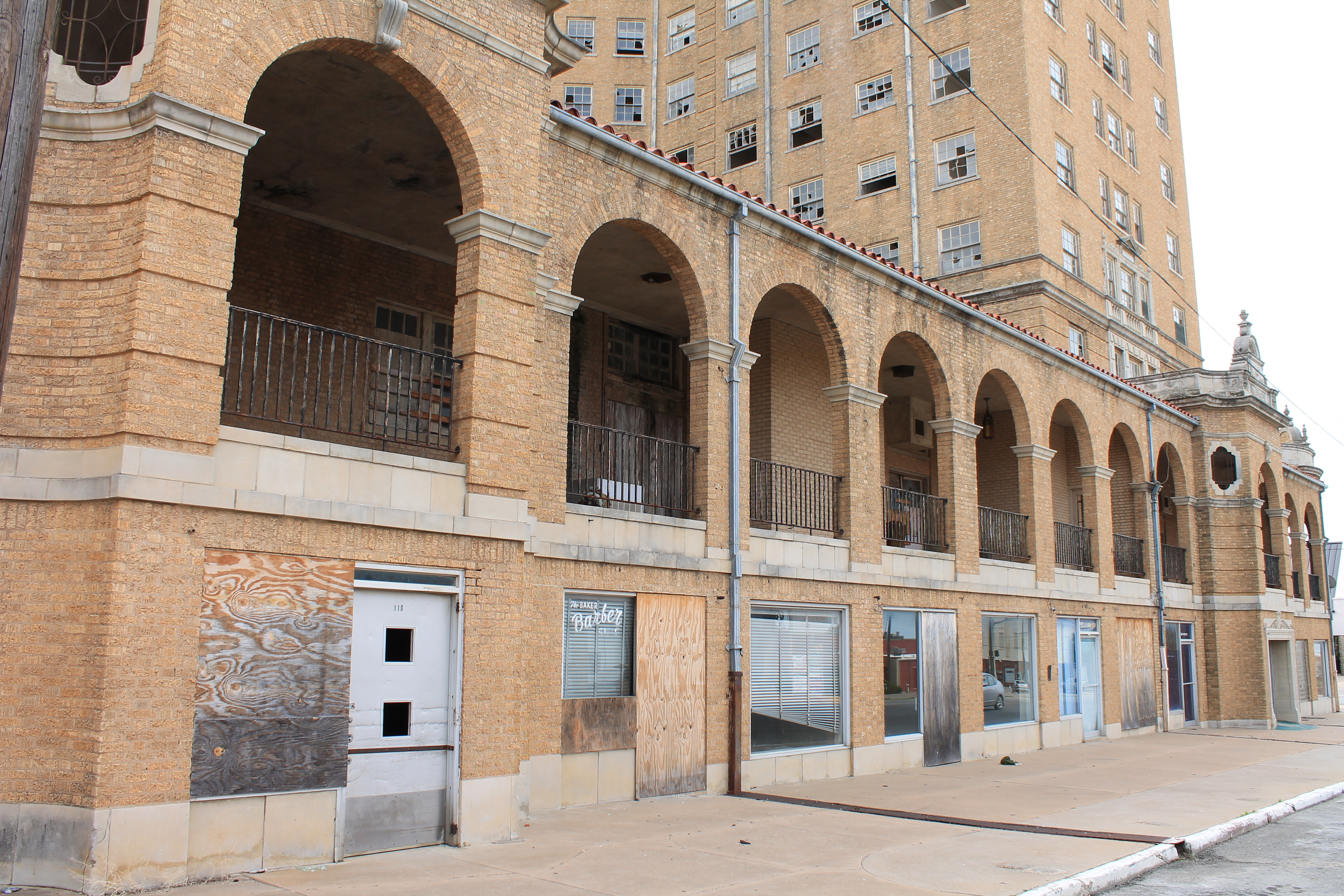

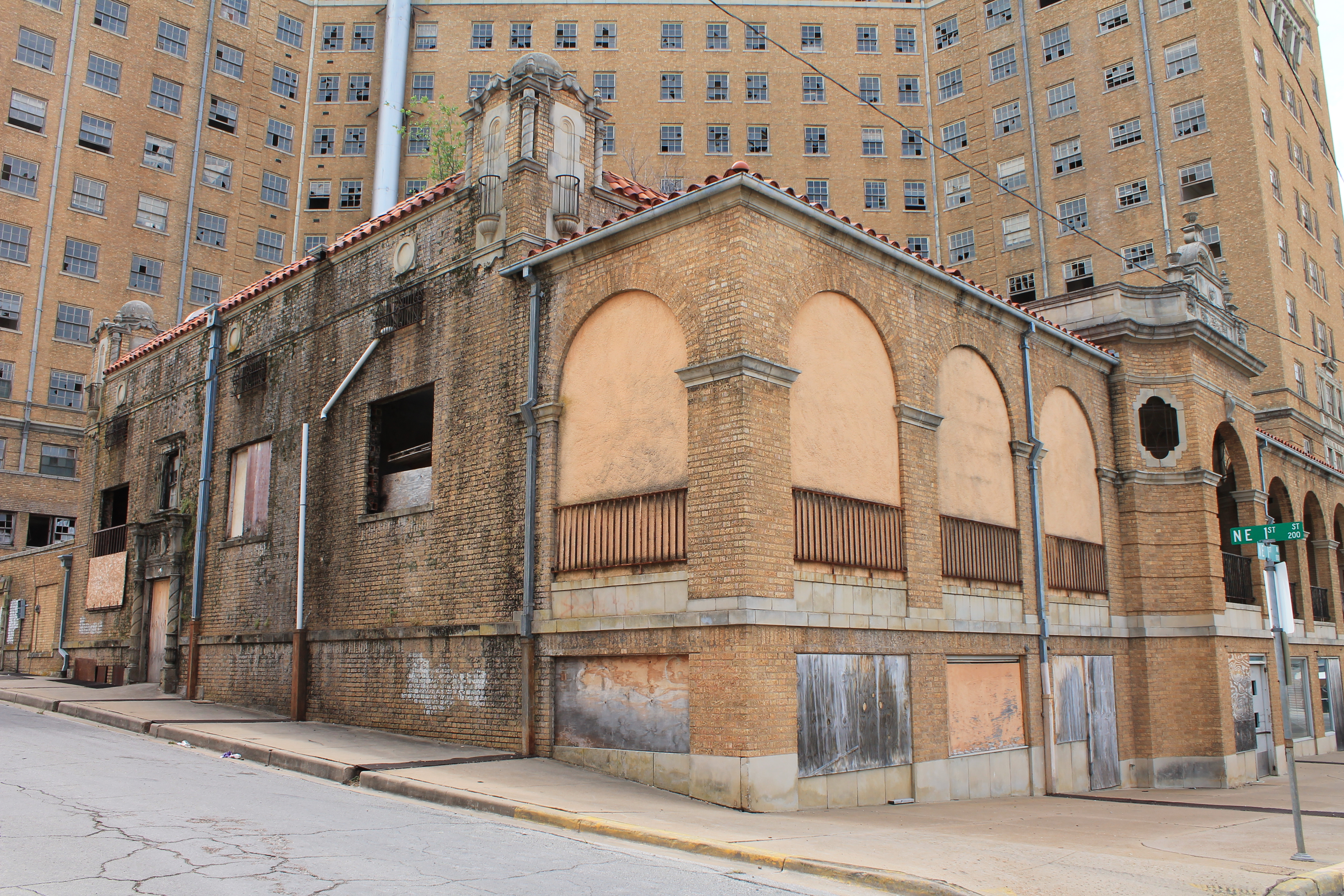

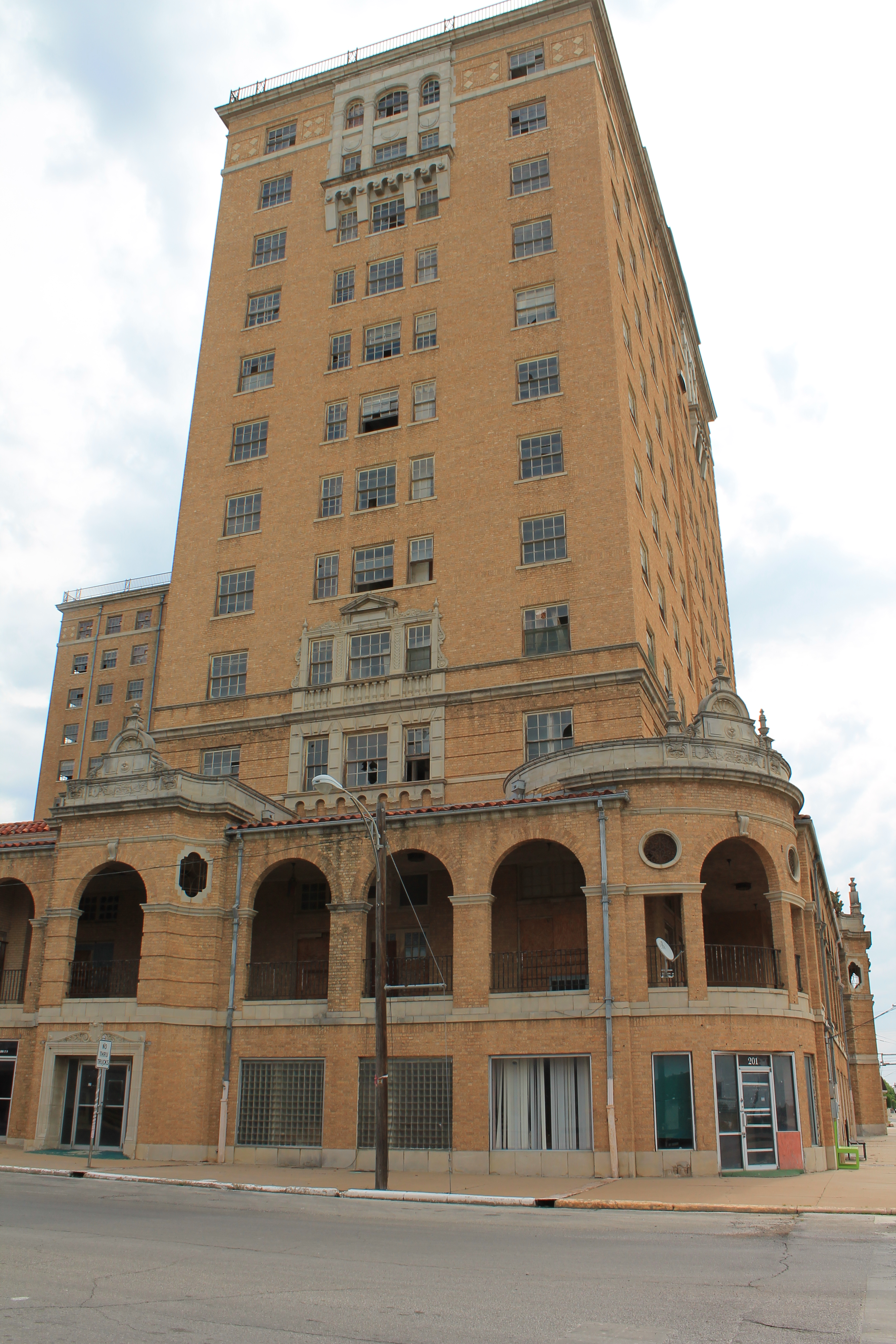

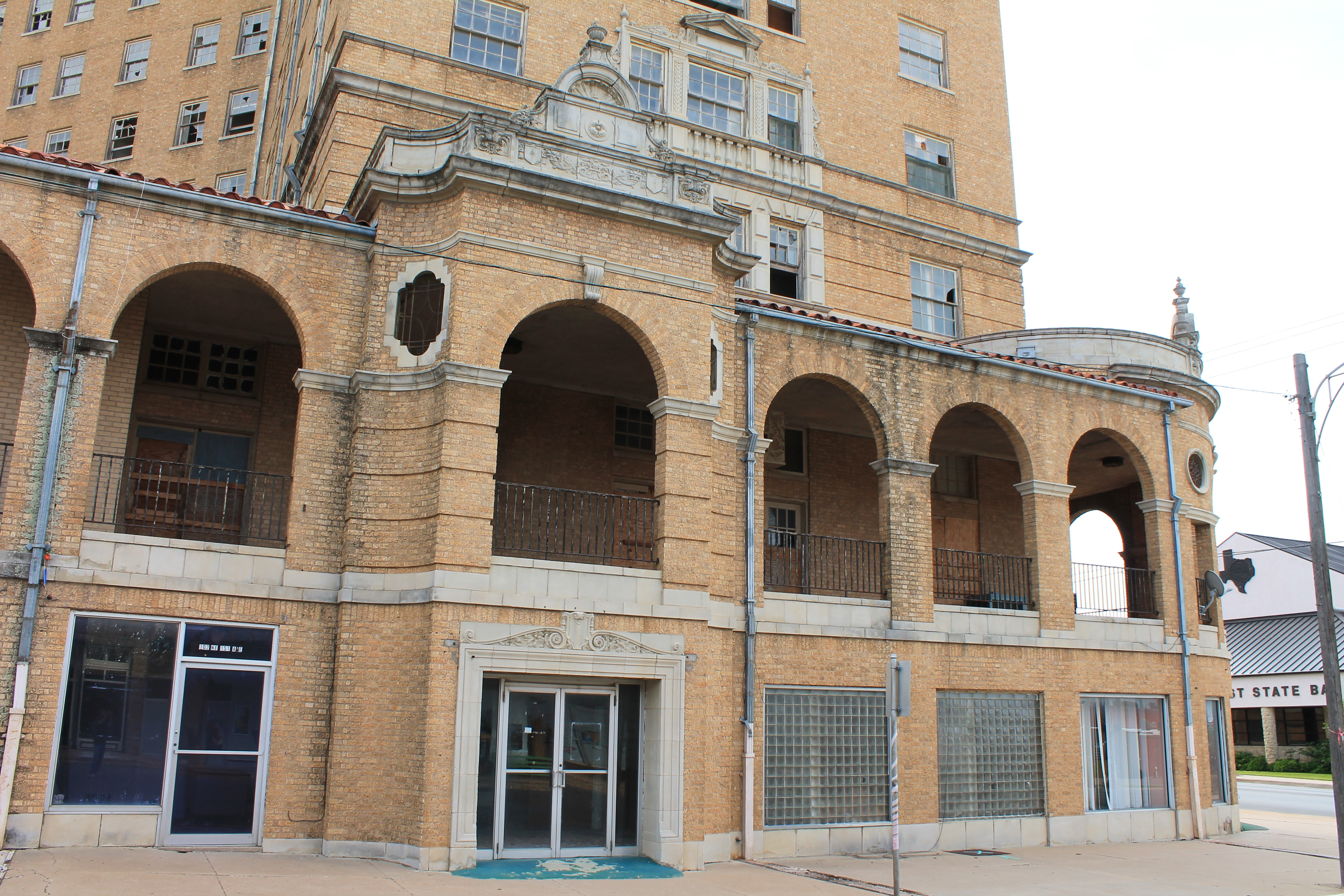

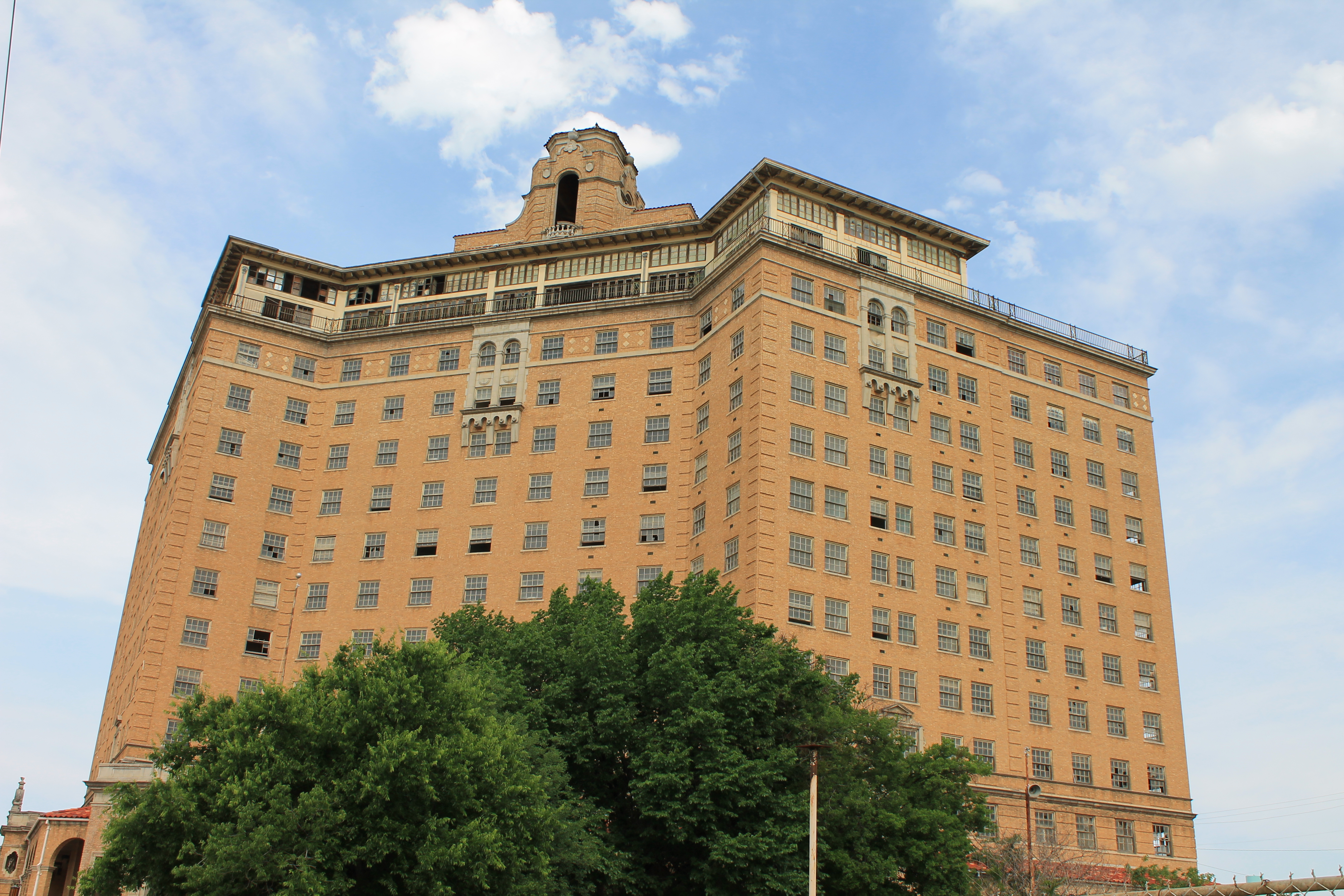

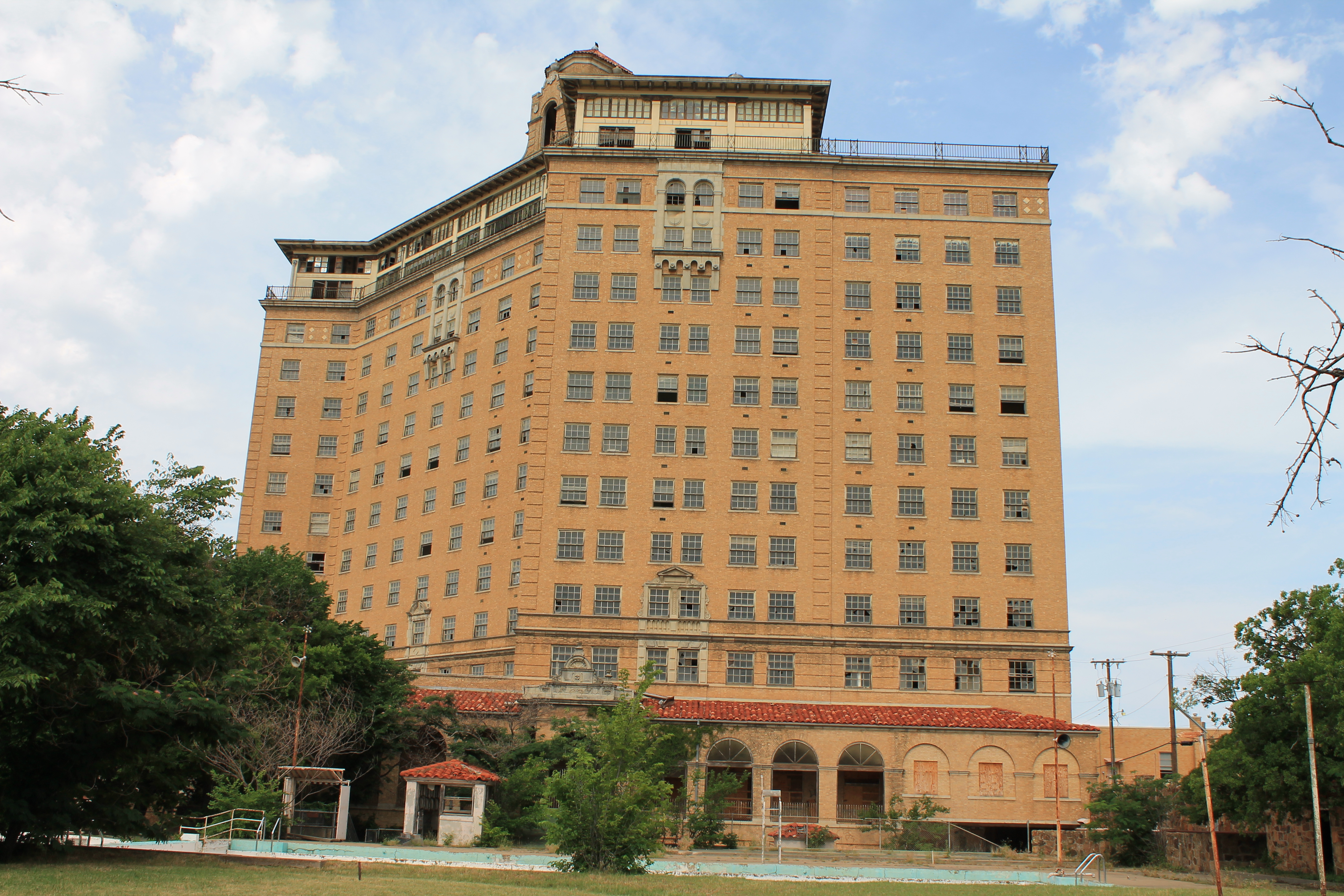

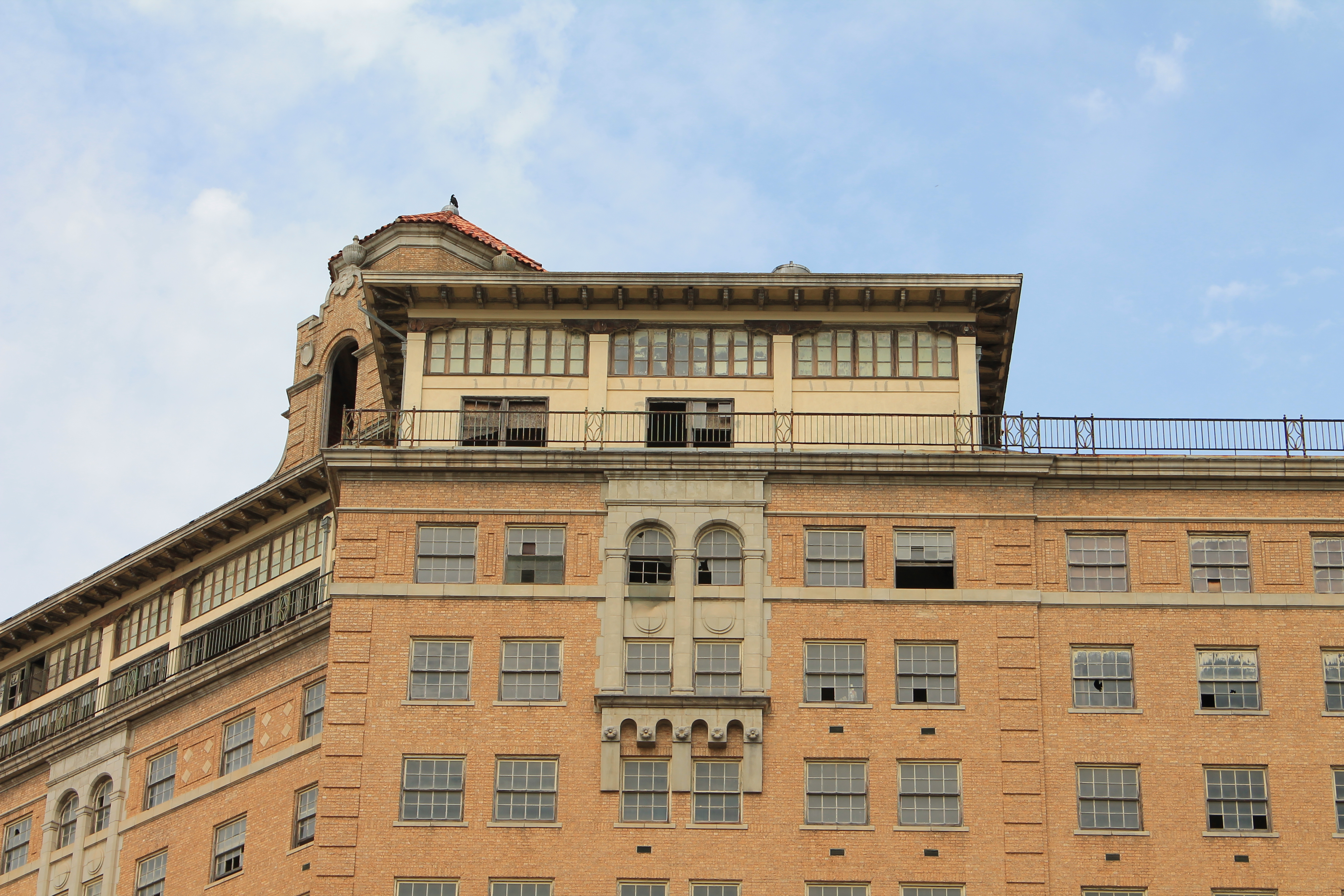

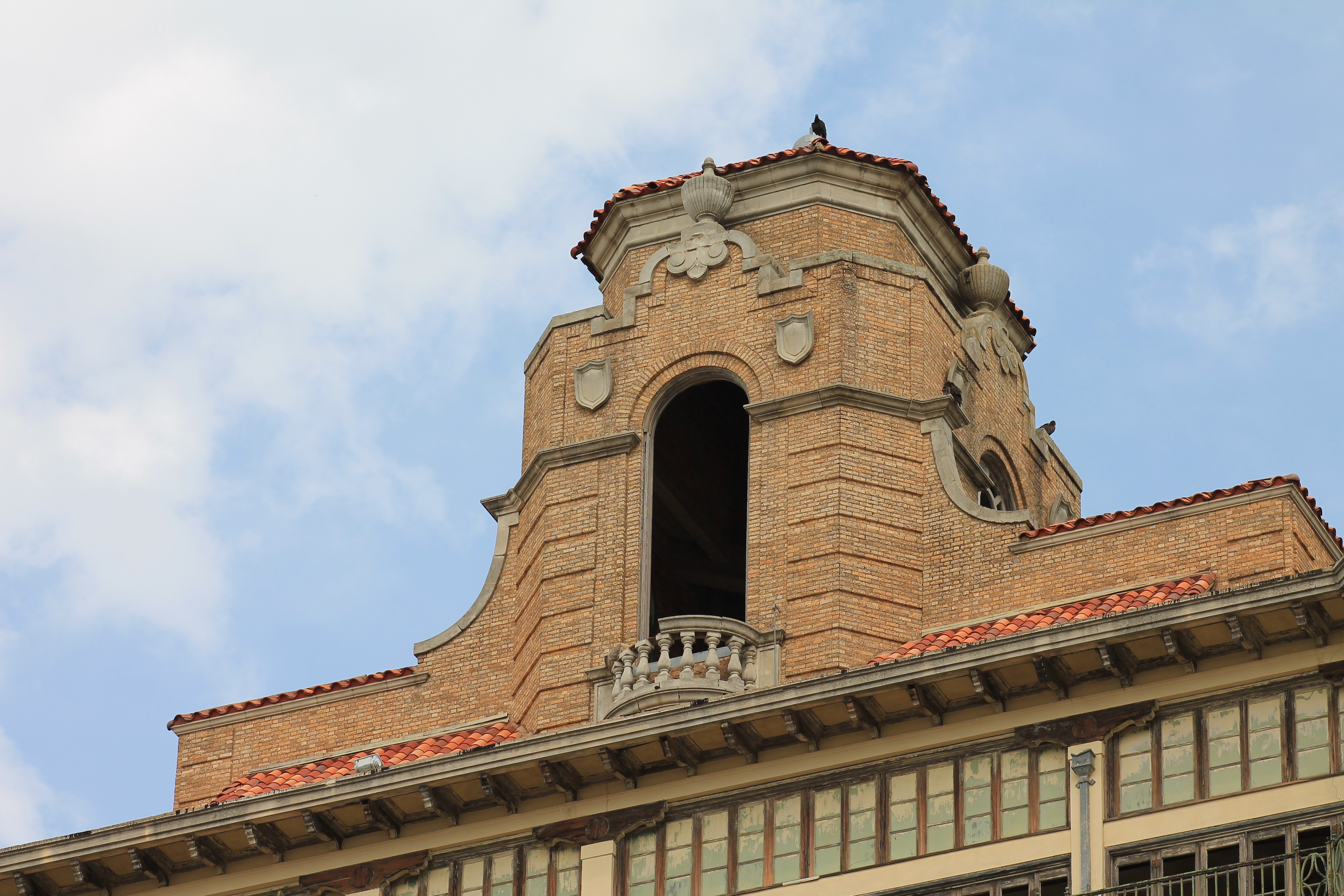

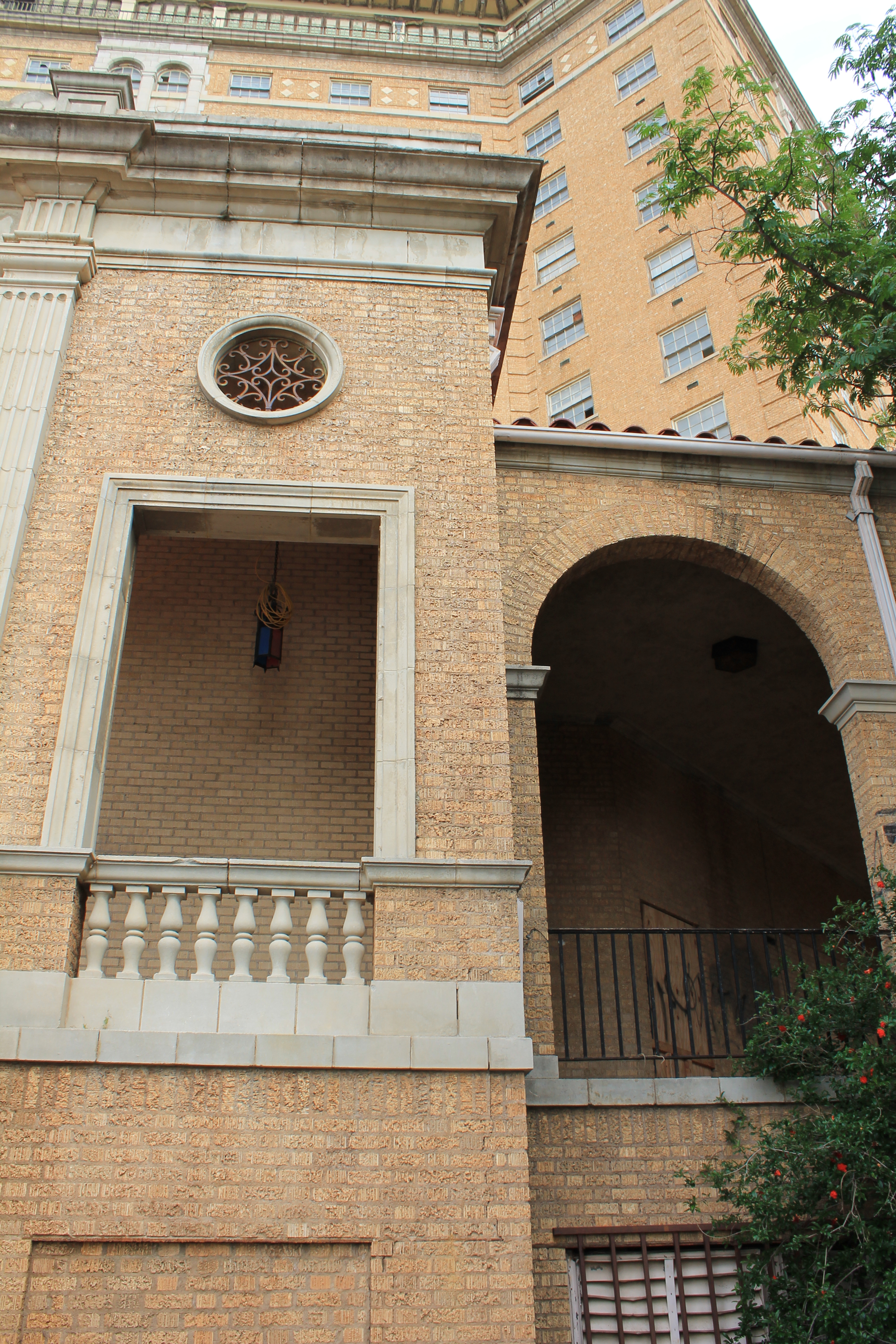

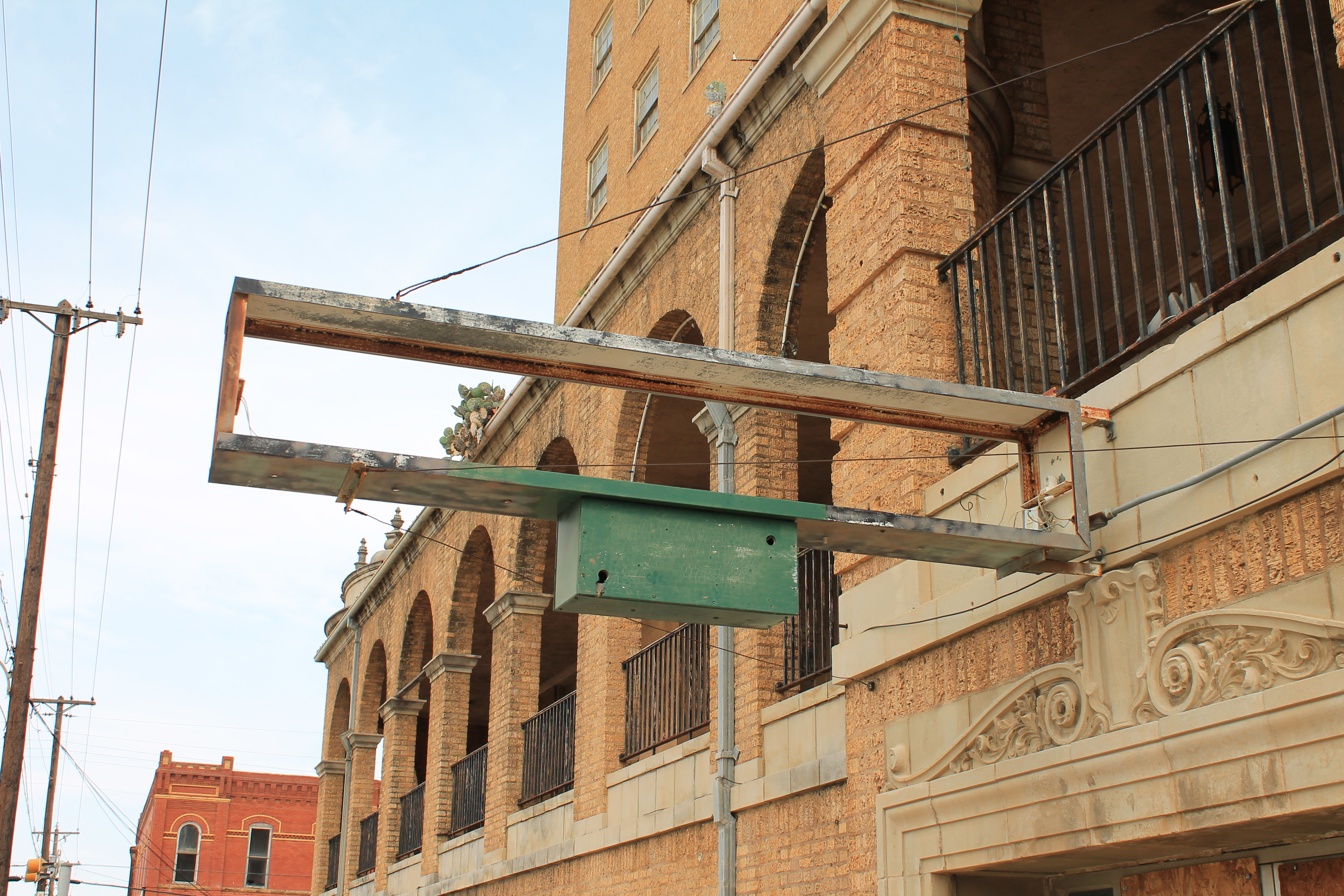

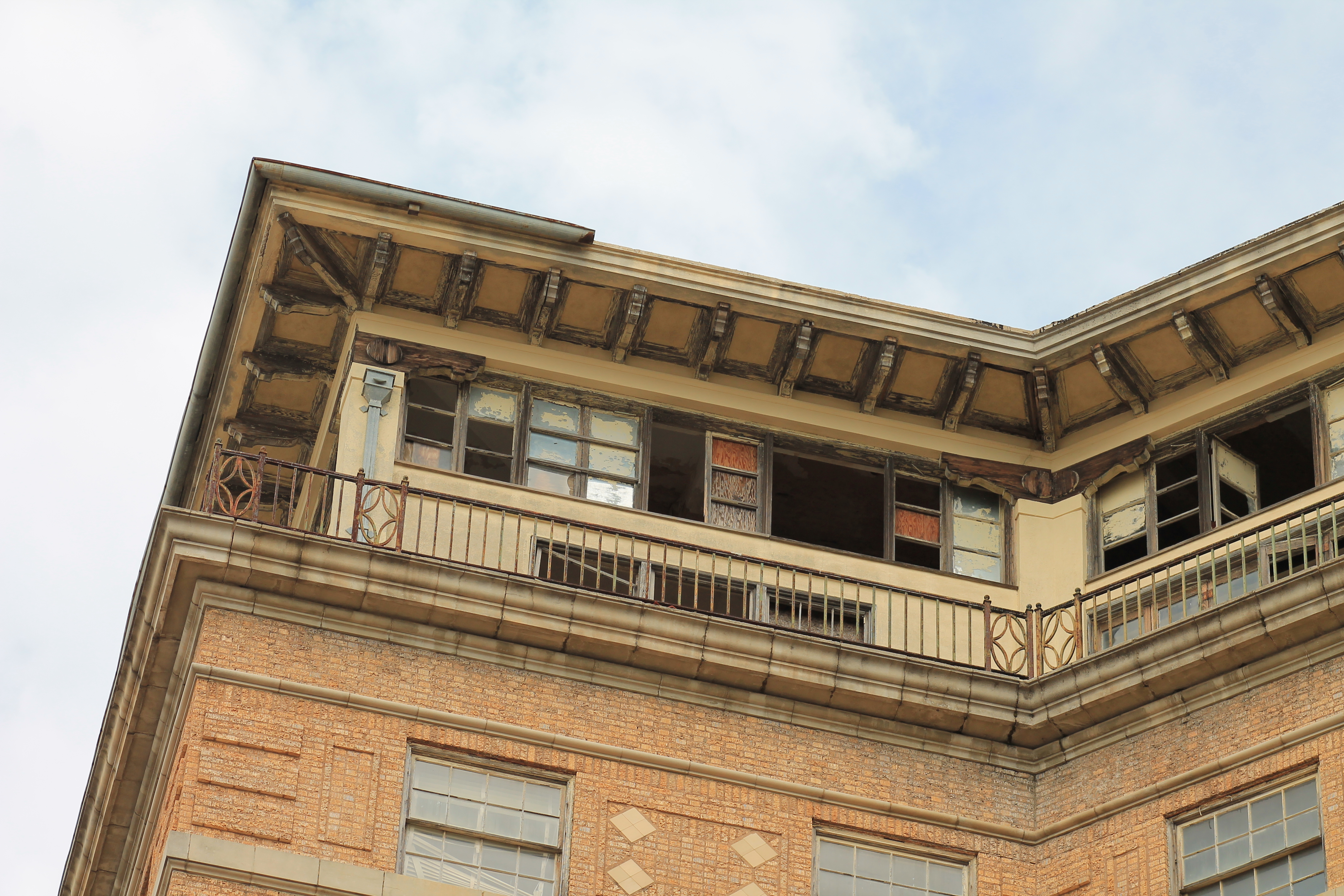

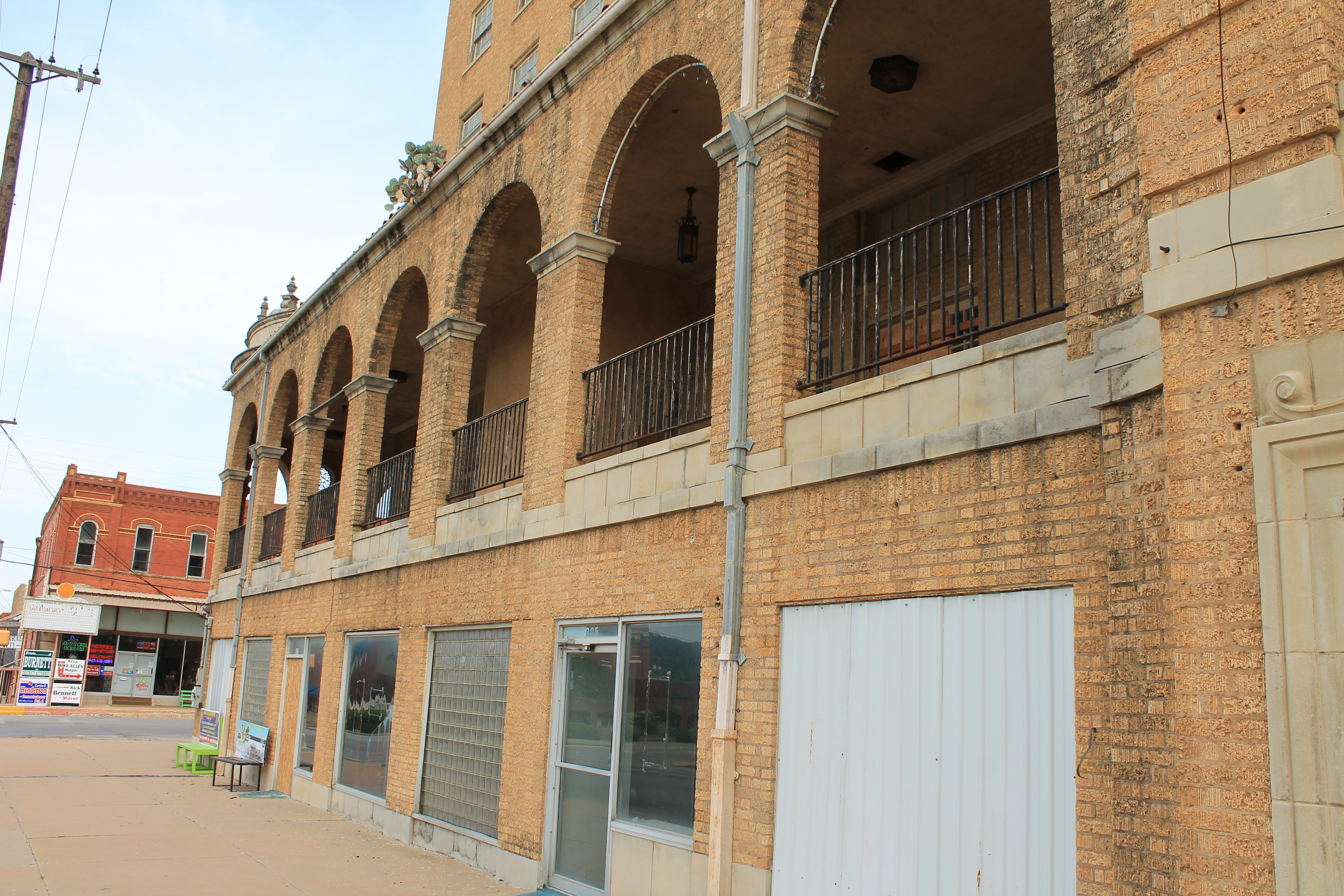

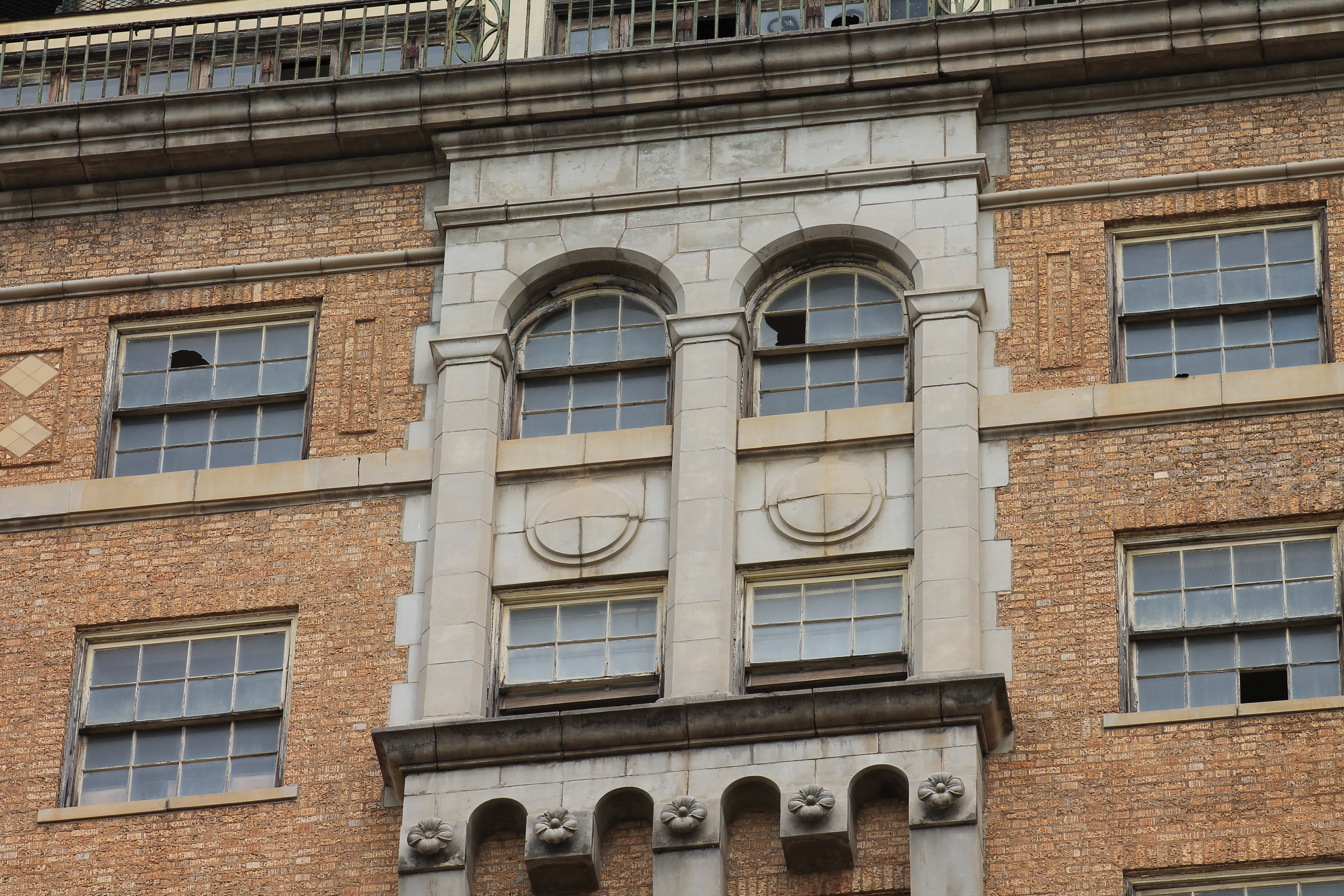

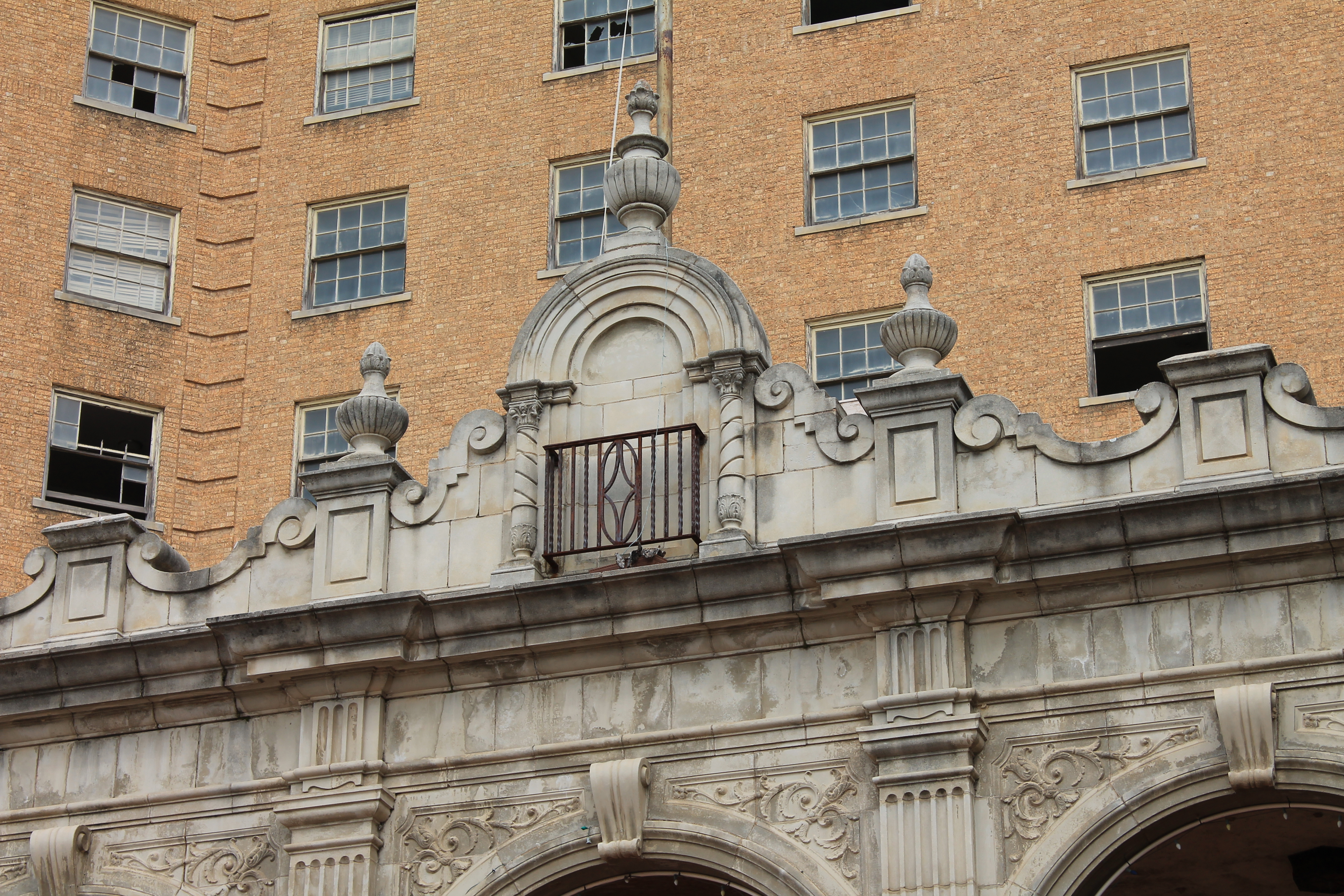

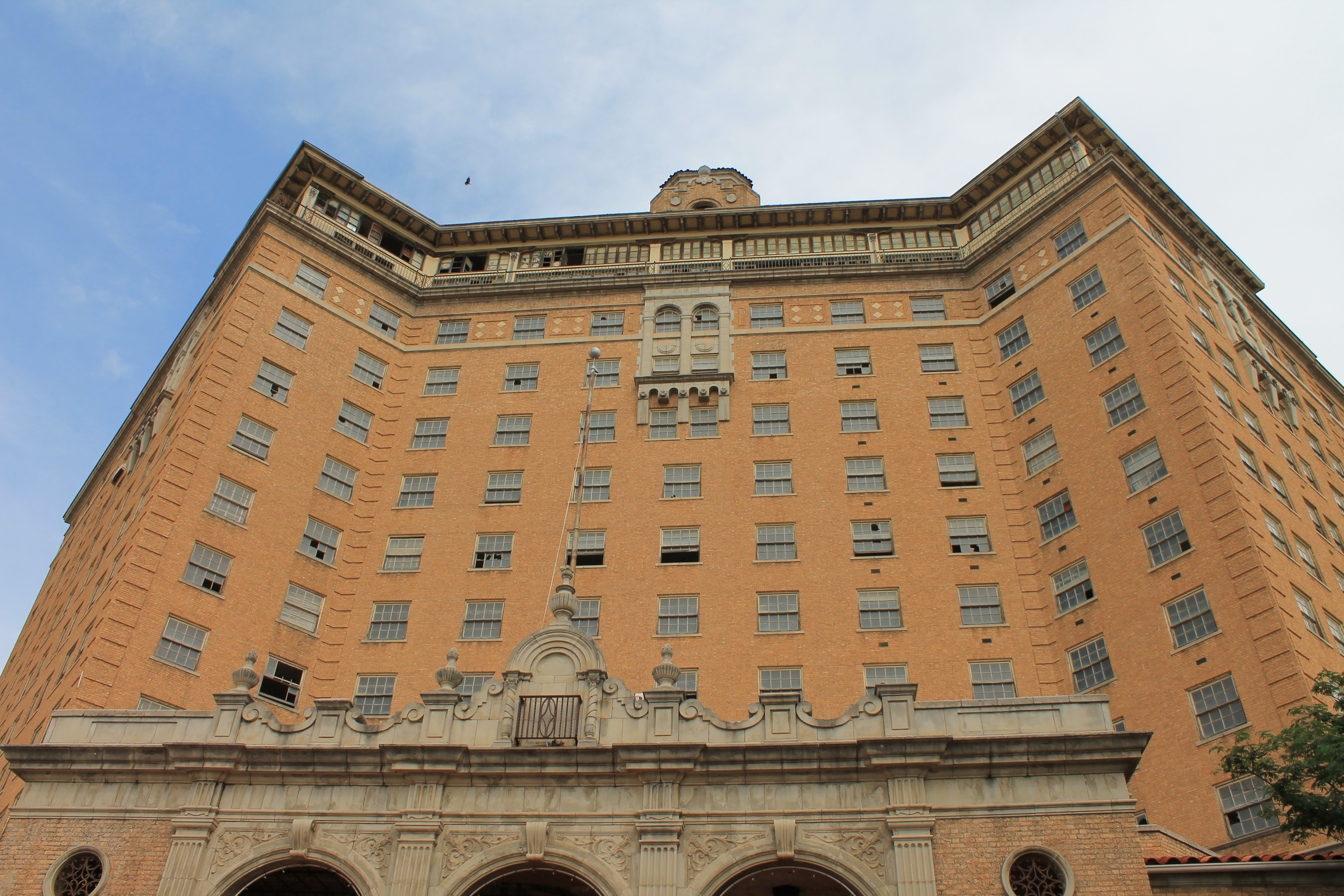

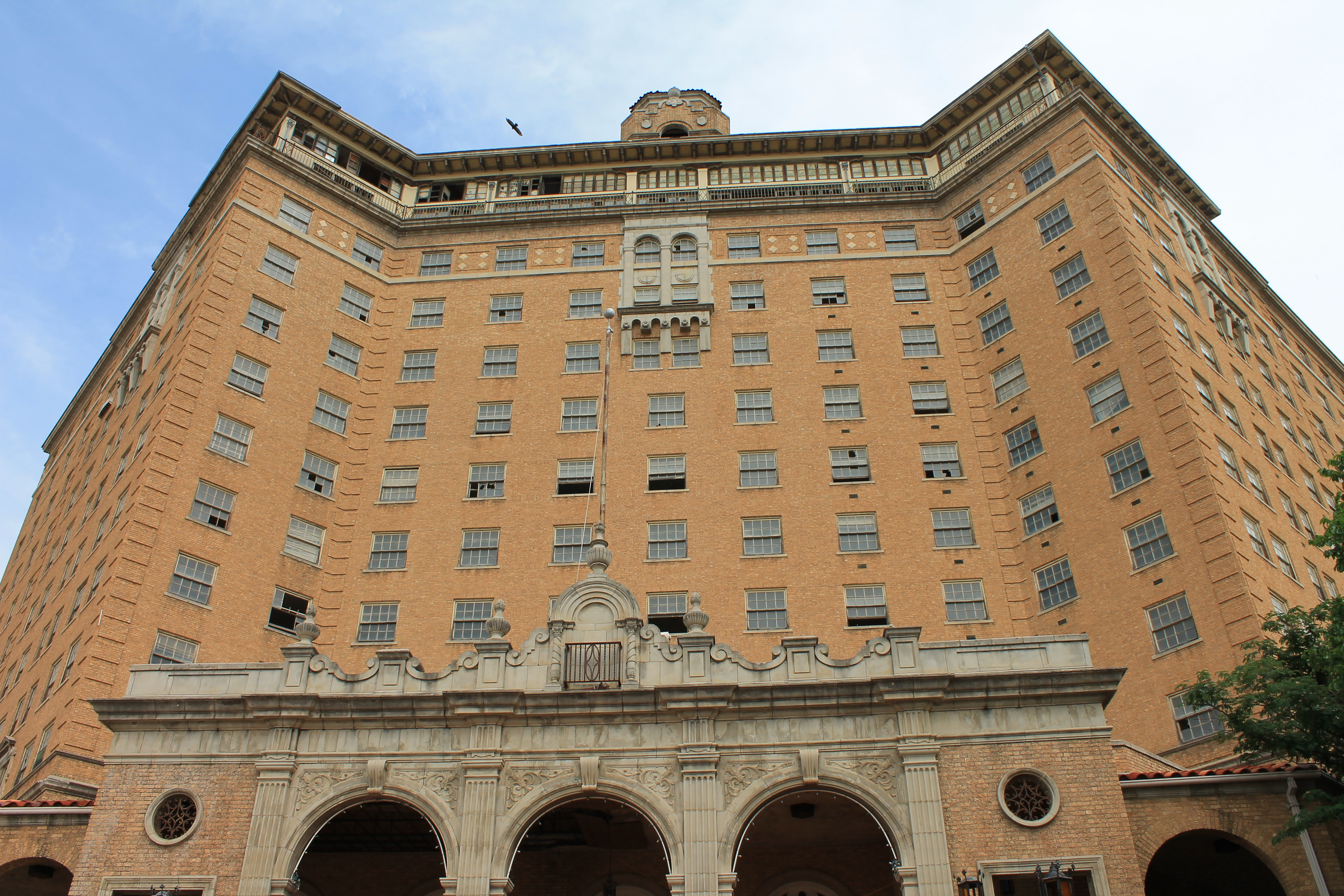

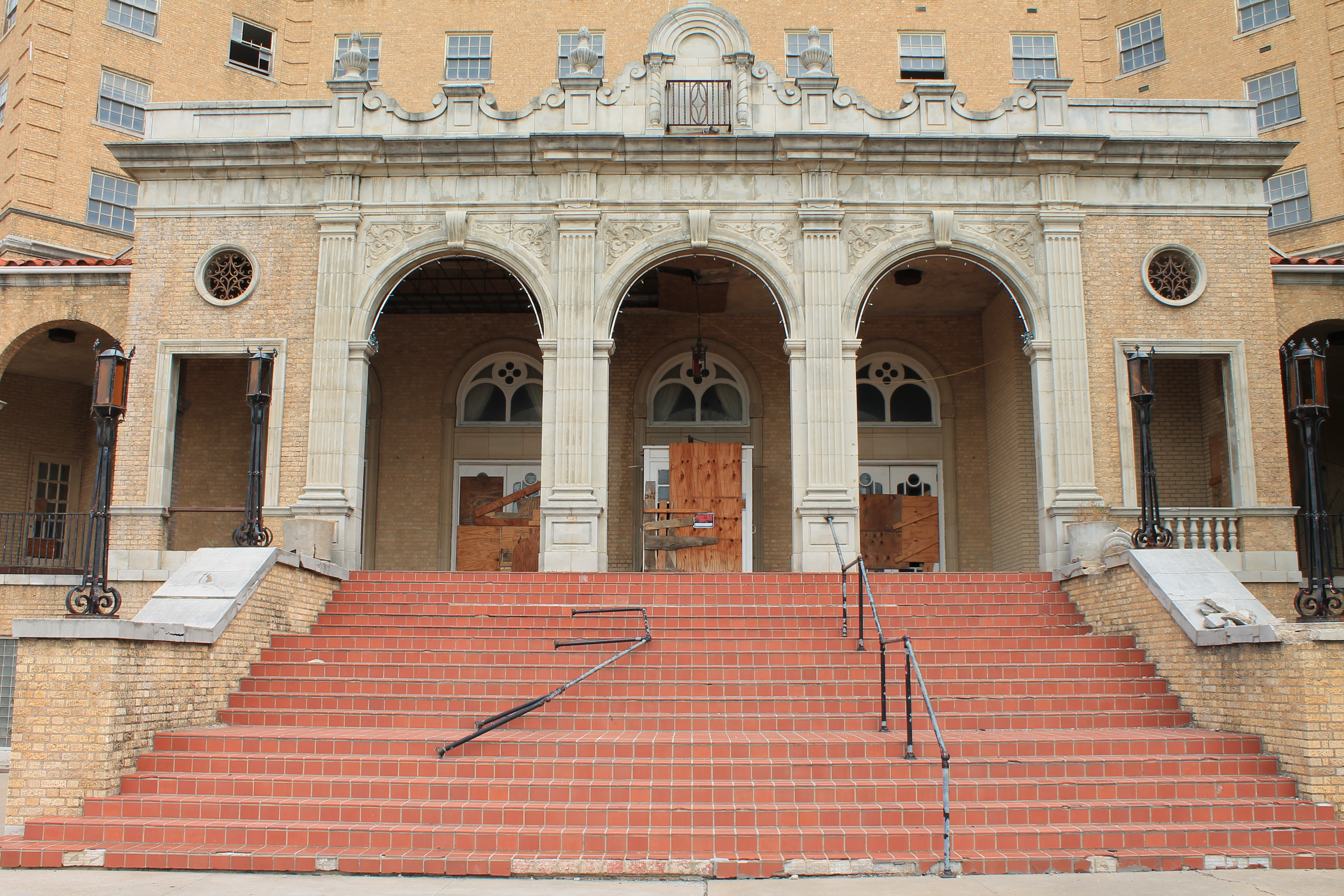

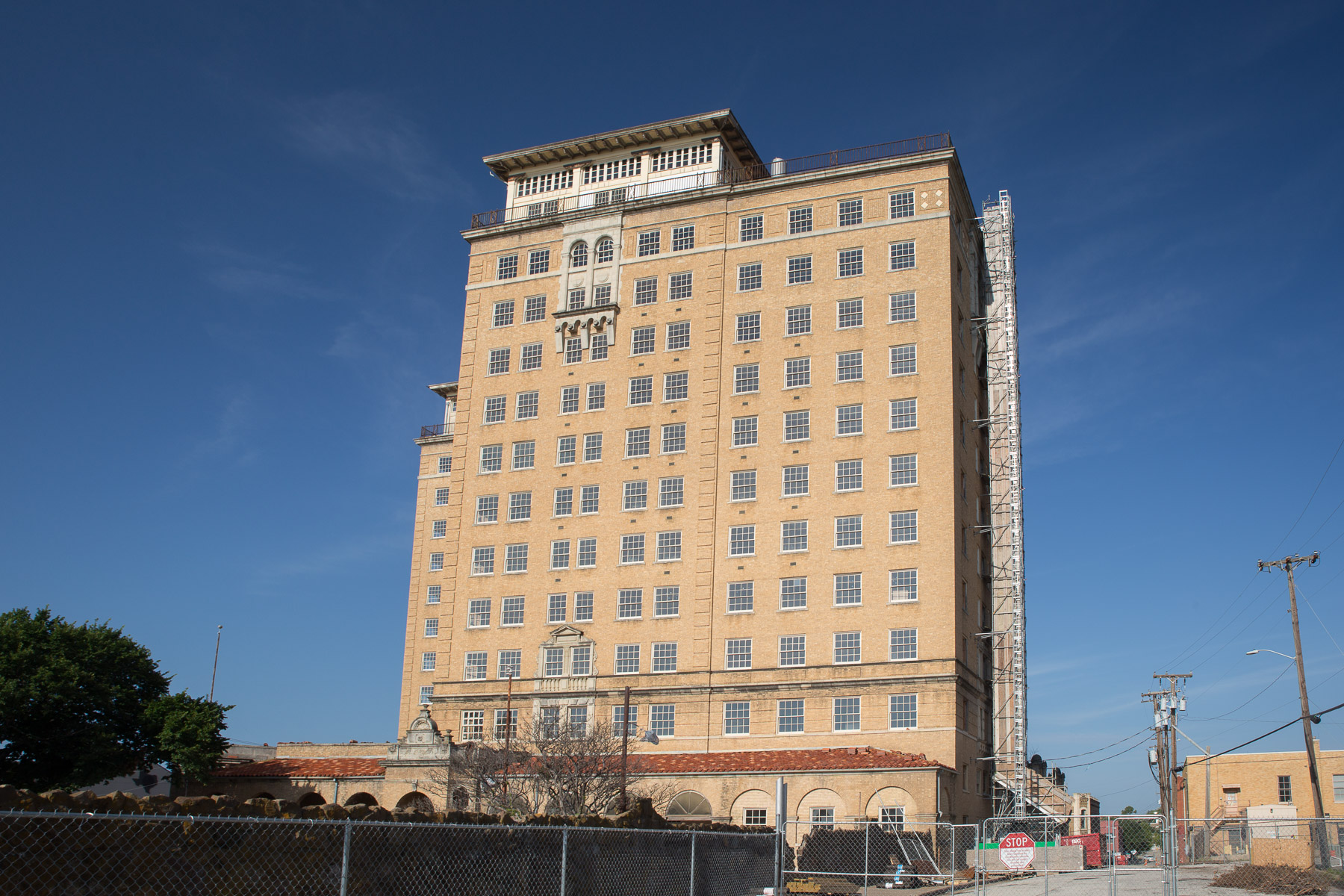

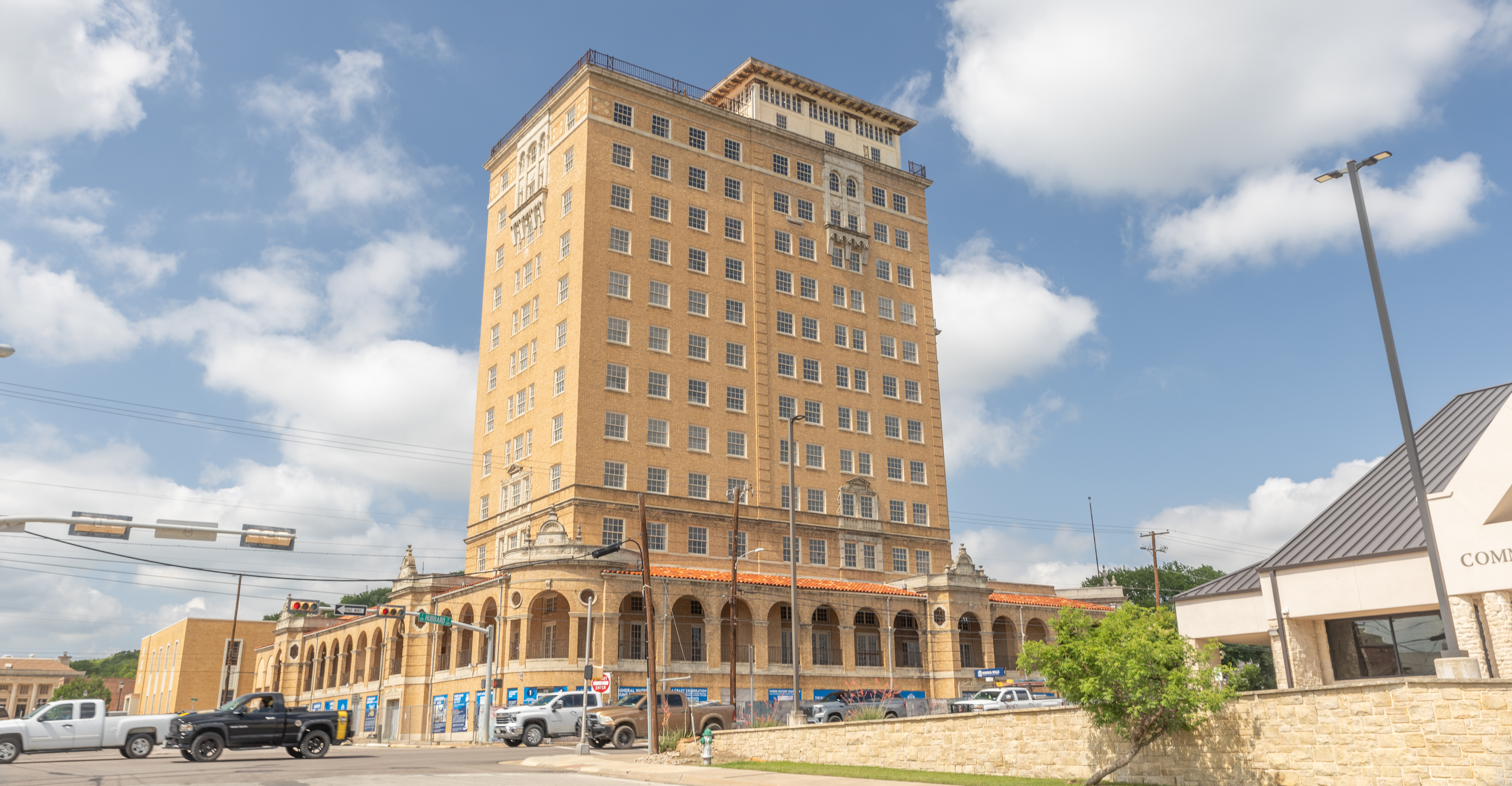

== See also ==
- National Register of Historic Places listings in Palo Pinto County, Texas
