= National Register of Historic Places listings in Palo Pinto County, Texas =

Location of Palo Pinto County in Texas

This is a list of the National Register of Historic Places listings in Palo Pinto County, Texas it is intended to be a complete list of properties listed on the National Register of Historic Places in Palo Pinto County, Texas. Ten properties are listed on the National Register in the county. One property is also a Recorded Texas Historic Landmark.

This National Park Service list is complete through NPS recent listings posted March 6, 2026.

== Current listings ==
The locations of National Register properties may be seen in a mapping service provided.

	Name on the Register	Image	Date listed	Location	City or town	Description
1	Baker Hotel	Baker Hotel	June 23, 1982 (#82004518)	200 E. Hubbard St. 32°48′35″N 98°06′00″W	Mineral Wells	
2	First Presbyterian Church	First Presbyterian Church	June 14, 1979 (#79003004)	410 NW 2nd St. 32°48′41″N 98°06′56″W	Mineral Wells	Demolished
3	Gallagher House	Gallagher House	April 27, 2011 (#11000232)	2919 Union Hill Rd; 32°52′51″N 98°08′51″W	Mineral Wells vicinity	
4	Mineral Wells Central Historic District	Mineral Wells Central Historic District	September 4, 2020 (#100005524)	Roughly bounded by NW 9th St., NE 3rd Ave., SE 6th St., and NW 3rd Ave. 32°48′33″N 98°06′46″W	Mineral Wells	
5	Palo Pinto County Courthouse	Palo Pinto County Courthouse	April 17, 1997 (#97000365)	520 Oak St. 32°46′03″N 98°17′57″W	Palo Pinto	
6	Palo Pinto County Jail	Palo Pinto County Jail	September 26, 1979 (#79003005)	Elm St. and 5th Ave; 32°45′24″N 98°17′53″W	Palo Pinto	
7	State Highway 16, Brazos River Bridge Segment	State Highway 16, Brazos River Bridge Segment	April 14, 2015 (#15000153)	TX 16 from 7.4 mi. northeast of US 180 to junction of TX 16 & TX 254; 32°52′31″N 98°24′44″W	Graford vicinity	
8	US 281 Bridge at the Brazos River	US 281 Bridge at the Brazos River	October 10, 1996 (#96001126)	US 281, 2.2 mi (3.5 km) north of Interstate 20; 32°38′29″N 98°06′00″W	Santo	
9	Weatherford-Mineral Wells and Northwestern Railroad Depot	Weatherford-Mineral Wells and Northwestern Railroad Depot	January 5, 1984 (#84001953)	S. Oak St. 32°48′22″N 98°06′41″W	Mineral Wells	Recorded Texas Historic Landmark
10	Zim's Bottling Works and Tourist Park	Zim's Bottling Works and Tourist Park	March 6, 2026 (#100012785)	10990 Texas State Highway 16 S 32°33′48″N 98°29′50″W	Strawn	

== See also ==
- National Register of Historic Places listings in Texas
- Recorded Texas Historic Landmarks in Palo Pinto County
