= Flaminio Malaguti =

Italian poker player

- Born: Ferrara, Italy
- Occupation: Poker Player
- Years active: 2006-present
- Children: 1, ZaZa Maree

Flaminio Malaguti is an Italian professional poker player residing in Las Vegas, NV.

== Poker career ==
Malaguti placed 6th in the 2009 World Series of Poker $1,500 Limit Hold'em Shootout. In 2012, he completed four world record poker achievements including 15 cashes in a single month and 51 cashes, 20 first place tournament wins, and 39 final tables in a calendar year. In 2013, he had 73 ITM (in the money) tournament finishes, which lead to him obtaining the all-time world record for most ITMs in a calendar year. Malaguti won the 2013 WSOP Deepstack Player of the Year award after finishing with the most points out of all players competing in a specific series of WSOP tournaments between 29 May and 30 June 2013. He placed 503rd in the 2017 WSOP main event. As of 2018, Malaguti has earned $393,751 through sanctioned poker tournaments. Malaguti has 109 first place tournament wins, the all-time world record for most first place tournament wins in the history of poker.

== Personal life ==
Malaguti lives in Las Vegas, NV and has a daughter, singer-songwriter ZaZa Maree. He is the owner of the Rock 'n' Roll Cafe on the Las Vegas strip.
