= US 281 Bridge at the Brazos River =

- U.S. National Register of Historic Places
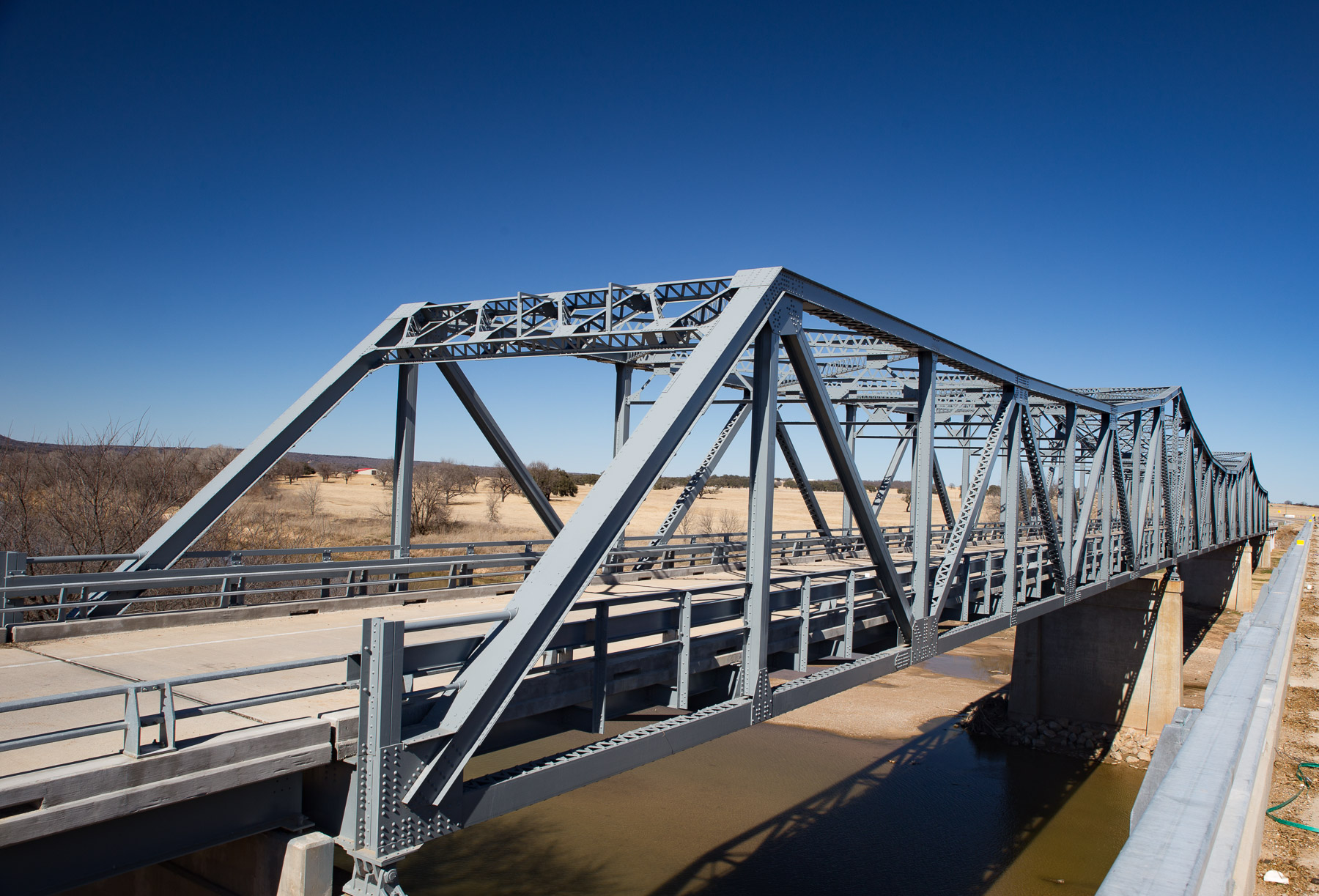
- US 281 Brazos River Bridge

- Location within Texas Location within the United States
- Nearest city: Santo, Texas
- Coordinates: 32°38′29″N 98°6′0″W
- Area: less than one acre
- Built: 1938
- Built by: Bethlehem Steel Company; Brown & Root, Inc.; et al.
- Architectural style: continuous through truss
- MPS: Historic Bridges of Texas MPS
- NRHP reference No.: 96001126
- Added to NRHP: October 10, 1996

US 281 Bridge at the Brazos River refers to two bridges located south of Mineral Wells, Texas. They carry U.S. Route 281 (US 281) across the Brazos River.

The original bridge built in 1939 was added to the National Register on October 10, 1996. In 2016, the Texas Department of Transportation constructed a second bridge east of the original bridge. The new bridge was used to carry traffic in both directions while rehabilitation was carried out on the original bridge. After the rehabilitation, the original bridge was reopened to southbound traffic, with the new bridge solely carrying northbound traffic.

== See also ==
- National Register of Historic Places listings in Palo Pinto County, Texas
- List of bridges on the National Register of Historic Places in Texas
