= First Presbyterian Church (Mineral Wells, Texas) =

Historic church in Texas, United States

- U.S. National Register of Historic Places
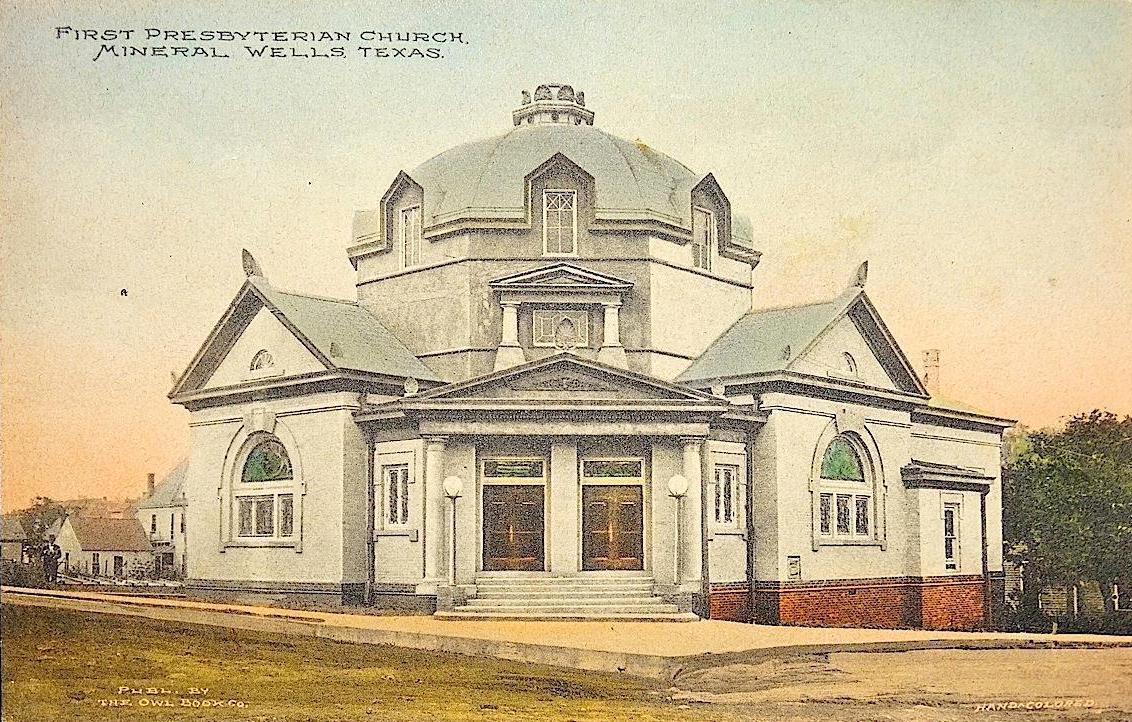

- Location within Texas Location within the United States
- Location: 410 NW 2nd St., Mineral Wells, Texas
- Coordinates: 32°48′41″N 98°6′56″W
- Area: less than one acre
- Built: 1909
- Architect: Murphy & Croft
- Architectural style: Classical Revival
- NRHP reference No.: 79003004
- Added to NRHP: June 14, 1979

First Presbyterian Church is a historic Presbyterian church building at 410 NW 2nd Street in Mineral Wells, Texas.

The Classical Revival building was constructed in 1909 and added to the National Register of Historic Places in 1979. The structure was demolished sometime in the 1980s and replaced.

== See also ==
- National Register of Historic Places listings in Palo Pinto County, Texas
