= Gigi Cesarè =

American actress (born 2005)

Gigi Cesare
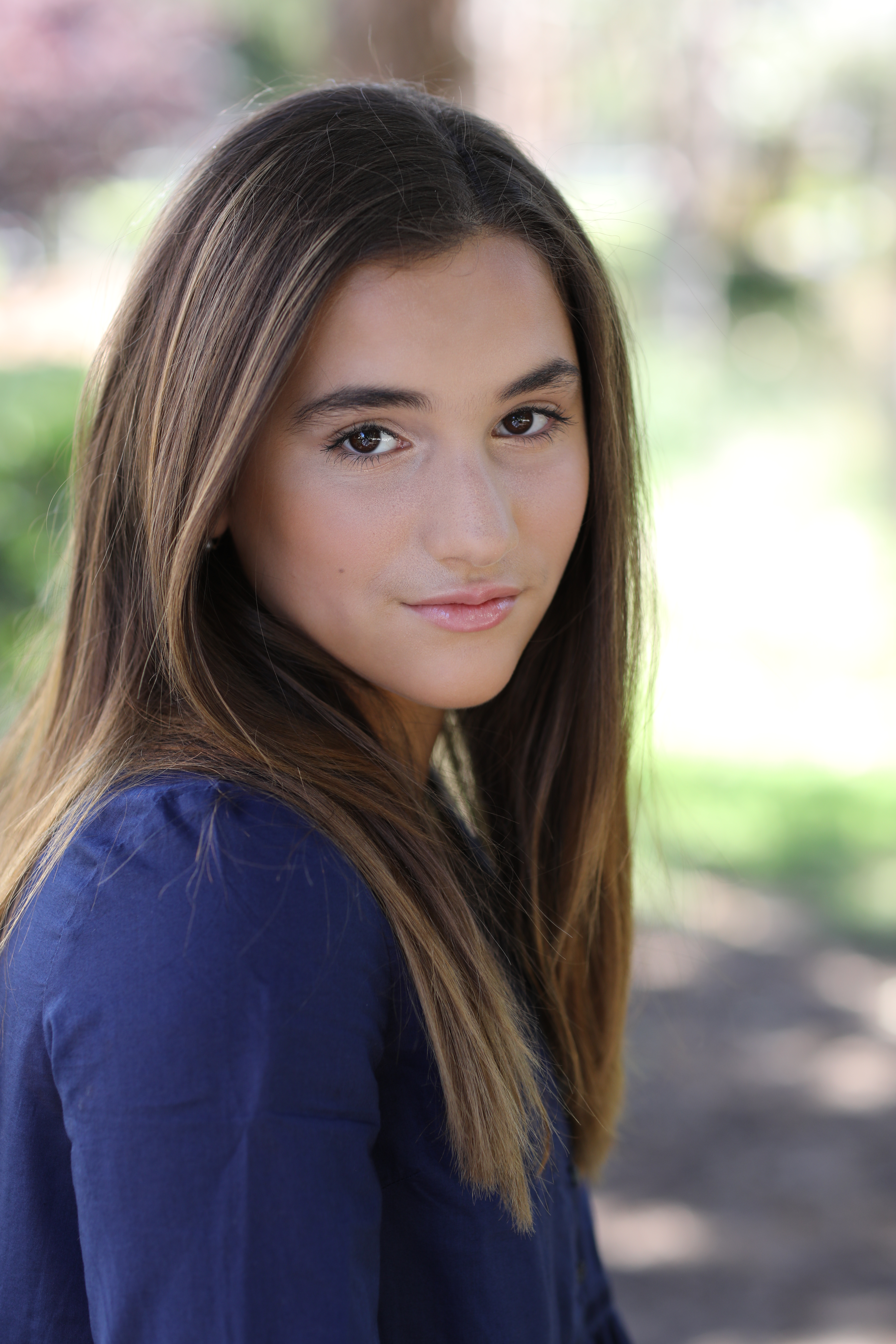
- Born: Giovanna Cesare; April 3, 2005 (age 21); Hershey, Pennsylvania
- Known for: Jessy in Street
- Awards: see below
- Website: gigicesare.com

Giovanna Cesare (born April 3, 2005 in Hershey, Pennsylvania), also known as Gigi Cappetta, Giovanna Cappetta, and Merdix Antwinette is a Latina American actress and recording artist. Cesare is best known for co-starring as Jessy in film Street.

== Career ==
Cesare started her career at the age of six. She is best known for her role as Jessy in Street and lead role as Sarah Lapp in the TV series Amish Haunting filmed at the true Amish farm historical White Chimneys. She is also known for her role as Nina in the film The Kids From 62F.

== Filmography ==
Television

| Year | Title | Role |
|---|---|---|
| 2012 | Celebrity Ghost Stories | Harper |
| 2013 | Sleeping with the Fishes | Guest at Bat Mitzvah |
| 2013 | The Blacklist | Schoolgirl |
| 2014 | The Can | Sarah |
| 2014 | The Haunting of... | Harper Cullen |
| 2014 | Amish Haunting (documentary) | Sarah Lapp |
| 2015 | The Story of Billy the Kidd (TV movie) | Amy |
| 2015 | Disillusioned | Kid |

Films

| Year | Title | Role |
|---|---|---|
| 2013 | Jew in Choctaw Country (Short) | Christine |
| 2013 | Charity Case (Short) | Autumn |
| 2013 | Innova (Short) | Izzy |
| 2014 | Moreau | Young Charlie |
| 2014 | A Little Game | Schoolgirl |
| 2014 | Diamonds to Dust | Mariska Hargitay |
| 2014 | The Lion (Short) | |
| 2014 | Ready or Not (Short) | Riley |
| 2014 | Jew in Choctaw Country Pt 3 (Short) | Daughter #1 |
| 2014 | La vie est belle (Short) | Eden |
| 2014 | The 30 Year Old Bris | Schoolgirl |
| 2015 | Alma (Short) | Gaby |
| 2015 | Street | Jessy |
| 2016 | Rum Runners | Young Kitt |
| 2016 | The Kids from 62-F | Nina |
| 2016 | Finding Riley (Short) | Riley |
| 2016 | Tom's Dilemma | Sarah |
| 2017 | The Downside of Bliss | Amber |
| 2017 | Street 2 Death Fight | Jessy |
| 2018 | Within and Without (Short) | Emily |
| 2018 | Mordy (Short) | Isabelle |
| 2018 | Lil' Varmints | Millie Tate |

== Awards and nominations ==
| Year | Nomination | Category | Film | Result | Ref. |
|---|---|---|---|---|---|
| 2017 | Imagen Award | Best Actress | The Kids From 62-F | Nominated | |
| 2016 | Young Entertainer Awards | Best Supporting Young Actress | Street (2015) | Won | |
| 2014 | Young Artist Awards | Best Performance in a Short Film | Young Actress 10 and Under | Won | |
