= Celebrity Ghost Stories =

- Genre: Paranormal
- Country of origin: United States
- Original language: English
- No. of seasons: 6
- No. of episodes: 98

Production
- Executive producers: Seth Jarrett; Julie Jarrett; Joel Rodgers; Elaine Frontain Bryant; Shelly Tatro; Devon Graham Hammonds; Molly Ebinger; Kim Russo
- Running time: 40–42 minutes
- Production company: Jarrett Creative

Original release
- Network: The Biography Channel (seasons 1–4); Lifetime Movie Network (season 5); A&E (season 6)
- Release: October 3, 2009 – May 13, 2020

Related
- The Haunting Of

Celebrity Ghost Stories is an American paranormal reality television series that debuted on October 3, 2009, with the pilot airing on September 26, 2009. Its first four seasons aired on The Biography Channel with the fifth airing on Lifetime Movie Network. In June 2019, A&E announced the revival of the series with the sixth-season premiere airing in the fall of the same year. Celebrity Ghost Stories interviews various celebrities who talk about paranormal events that have happened in their lives. A spin-off, The Haunting Of, features footage from the series and follows the celebrities as they go back to the places of their haunted experiences to find out the truth.

On February 18, 2020, it was announced that the sixth season would premiere on April 8, 2020. However, the new series was formatted to follow along the lines of "The Haunting Of" with psychic medium Kim Russo taking celebrities back to the scenes of their encounters, rather than the original series format of different celebrities telling stories of their own paranormal encounters.

== Episodes ==
=== Pilot ===
Belinda Carlisle, Sammy Hagar, Ernie Hudson and Gina Gershon

=== Season 1 ===
1. Joan Rivers, Scott Baio, Teri Polo and David Carradine – October 3, 2009
2. Carnie Wilson, Eric Roberts, Elisabeth Röhm and C. Thomas Howell – October 10, 2009
3. Carrie Fisher, Rue McClanahan, John Waters and Federico Castelluccio – October 17, 2009
4. Lisa Rinna, Jeffrey Ross, Vincent Curatola and Illeana Douglas – October 24, 2009
5. Tom Arnold, Dee Snider, Carnie Wilson and Nia Long – November 7, 2009
6. Barry Williams, Debi Mazar, Greg Grunberg and Sammy Hagar – November 14, 2009
7. Traci Lords, Jay Thomas, Justine Bateman and James Kyson Lee – November 21, 2009
8. Morgan Fairchild, John Salley, Lili Taylor and Vincent Curatola – December 5, 2009
9. Anson Williams, Ali Landry, Gina Gershon, Kelly Carlson and Ernie Hudson – December 12, 2009

=== Season 2 ===
1. Michael Imperioli, Joan Collins, Donna D'Errico, and Corey Feldman – July 17, 2010
2. Alice Cooper, Tracey Gold, Fred Dryer, and Kathryn Erbe – July 24, 2010
3. William Baldwin, Tracy Nelson, Tempestt Bledsoe, and Eric Balfour – July 31, 2010
4. Paulina Porizkova, Chazz Palminteri, Michael Urie, and Karina Smirnoff – August 7, 2010
5. Shirley Jones, Lindsay Wagner, Mykelti Williamson and Matthew Settle – August 14, 2010
6. Jermaine Jackson, Karina Smirnoff, Diane Ladd and Dave Foley – August 21, 2010
7. Christopher Knight, Carol Alt, Dick Van Patten, Marissa Jaret Winokur and Jerry Lobrow – August 28, 2010
8. Debbie Gibson, Joe Pantoliano, Kimberley Locke and Willie Garson – September 11, 2010
9. Laura Prepon, Vince Neil, Connie Stevens and Haylie Duff – September 18, 2010
10. Daryl Hannah, Maksim Chmerkovskiy, Shanna Moakler and Marilyn Manson – October 30, 2010
11. Rebecca De Mornay, Michael Rapaport and Margaret Cho – November 6, 2010
12. Vince Neil, Charisma Carpenter, Cynthia Rowley and Orlando Jones – November 13, 2010
13. Donny Most, Gena Lee Nolin, Fred Willard and Lolita Davidovich – November 20, 2010
14. Taylor Hicks, Janine Turner, Charles S. Dutton and Joshua Leonard – December 4, 2010
15. Shelley Long, Daniel Stern, Gail O'Grady and Matt Sorum – December 11, 2010
16. Sugar Ray Leonard, Aida Turturro, Larry Manetti and Johnathon Schaech – December 18, 2010
17. Joey Lawrence, Gabrielle Carteris, John Ventimiglia and Paul Shaffer – January 1, 2011
18. Cheri Oteri, Corbin Bernsen, John Schneider and Sharon Angela – January 8, 2011

=== Season 3 ===
1. Regis Philbin, Harry Hamlin, Ana Gasteyer and Jaime King – June 18, 2011
2. Bret Michaels, Natasha Henstridge, Penelope Ann Miller and Eva Amurri – June 25, 2011
3. Jerry Stiller, Mindy McCready, Nick Hogan and Lourdes Benedicto – July 9, 2011
4. Mindy Cohn, Valerie Harper, Matthew Gray Gubler and Nicole Eggert – July 16, 2011
5. Best of Special – July 23, 2011
6. Keshia Knight Pulliam, Ming-Na, Chi McBride and Mia Tyler – July 30, 2011
7. Brett Butler, Cassandra Peterson, Phil Varone and Ana Gasteyer – August 6, 2011
8. Beverly D'Angelo, Sally Struthers, and Melissa George – August 13, 2011
9. Loretta Lynn – August 20, 2011
10. Alan Thicke, Fairuza Balk, Kevin Pollak and Laila Ali – October 29, 2011
11. Dyan Cannon, Wendi McLendon-Covey, Quinton Aaron and Bridget Marquardt – November 5, 2011
12. Joan Osborne, Ahmad Rashad, Mia Tyler and Renée Taylor – November 12, 2011
13. Chaka Khan, Kristin Bauer and Iqbal Theba – November 19, 2011
14. Mickey Rooney, Brande Roderick, Eric Mabius and Kim Coles – November 26, 2011
15. Beverley Mitchell, Mark Curry, Donovan Leitch and Phyllis Diller – December 3, 2011
16. Susan Olsen, Rita Coolidge, Fairuza Balk and Enrico Colantoni – December 10, 2011
17. Christopher Atkins, María Conchita Alonso and Scott Patterson – December 17, 2011

=== Season 4 ===
1. Cindy Williams, Audrina Patridge, Giancarlo Esposito and Joan Van Ark – June 2, 2012
2. Billy Dee Williams, Jenna Morasca, Dee Wallace Stone and Kathrine Narducci – June 9, 2012
3. Erik Estrada, Micah Sloat, Joan Osborne and Reginald VelJohnson – June 16, 2012
4. Roddy Piper, Skylar Grey and Frank Whaley – June 23, 2012
5. Aaron Carter, Christopher McDonald, Kaya Jones and David Proval – June 30, 2012
6. Tito Ortiz, Cary Elwes, Sally Kellerman and Drake Bell – July 7, 2012
7. Tiffany, Tony Plana and Morgan Brittany – August 4, 2012
8. Lorenzo Lamas, Charles Shaughnessy and Kristen Renton – August 11, 2012
9. Tyler Blackburn, Lainie Kazan and Shari Headley – August 18, 2012
10. Jordan Ladd, Adrienne Barbeau, Kyle Massey, Gigi Cesarè and Brett Cullen – August 25, 2012
11. Jack Osbourne, Stephen Collins, Aasha Davis and David Lander – September 8, 2012
12. Erin Moran, Pia Zadora and Michael Beach – September 15, 2012
13. Diane Neal, Debbie Allen, Kevin Sorbo and Debbie Matenopoulos – September 22, 2012
14. Titus Welliver, Johnny Gill and Marcus Schenkenberg – October 13, 2012
15. Biz Markie, Erik Palladino and Rita Rudner – October 20, 2012
16. Dick Cavett, Monica Keena, Ace Young and Paul Iacono – October 27, 2012
17. Lewis Black, Meshach Taylor and Samantha Harris – November 3, 2012
18. Charo, William Mapother, Justin Guarini and Hope Dworaczyk – November 10, 2012
19. Bill Bellamy, Dawn Wells, Jack Blades and Mary Lambert – November 17, 2012
20. D. B. Sweeney, Adrian Zmed, Eddie Money and Nicole Leone – November 24, 2012
21. Linda Blair, Carlos Mencia, Victoria Rowell and Dot-Marie Jones – December 8, 2012
22. Tracy Scoggins, Fairuza Balk, Della Reese and Patrick Muldoon – December 15, 2012
23. Jackée Harry, Louie Anderson, Angie Stone and Richard Burgi – January 5, 2013
24. Patricia Velásquez, Susie Essman and Elya Baskin – January 12, 2013
25. Lisa Lisa, Bernie Kopell, Enrico Colantoni and Heather McDonald – January 19, 2013
26. Beverly Johnson, Charlene Tilton and Jimmy Wayne – January 26, 2013
27. Mariel Hemingway, Kevin Brown and Curtis Armstrong – February 2, 2013

=== Season 5 ===
1. George Wendt, Wayne Newton, Ace Frehley and April Mendez – June 1, 2013
2. Marisa Ramirez, Jimmie Walker, Lisa Vidal and Kate Vernon – June 8, 2013
3. Shar Jackson, Blair Brown, Esai Morales and John Hensley – June 15, 2013
4. Coco, Craig Kilborn, Diana DeGarmo and Tommy Davidson – June 22, 2013
5. Tom Green, Anthony Michael Hall, Brenda Epperson and Jacklyn Zeman – June 29, 2013
6. Richard Grieco, Ana Ortiz and Barry Bostwick – July 6, 2013
7. Nadine Velazquez, Burt Ward, Adrianna Costa and Bruce Davison – July 13, 2013
8. Jillian Barberie, Dan Cortese and Bruce Boxleitner – October 19, 2013
9. Michael Madsen, Linda Dano, Joanna Cassidy and Rae Dawn Chong – October 26, 2013
10. Andy Dick, Justin Henry, Nick Turturro and Betsey Johnson – November 2, 2013
11. Cherie Currie, Joseph Bologna, Diane Farr and Estella Warren – November 9, 2013
12. Jim Norton, Penny Johnson Jerald, Peter Scolari and Steven Williams – November 16, 2013
13. Marlee Matlin, Kim Carnes and Robert Carradine – November 23, 2013
14. Mary Lynn Rajskub, Dennis Christopher, Barbara Steele and Gary Daniels – March 22, 2014
15. Pam Grier, David Otunga, Max Adler and Golden Brooks – March 29, 2014
16. Louis Gossett Jr, Carolyn Hennesy, Nathan Morris and Kevin Nash – April 5, 2014
17. Downtown Julie Brown, Drita D'Avanzo, Jai Rodriguez and Nicholas Brendon – April 12, 2014
18. Julie White, Roger Bart, Dominique Swain and Thomas Ian Nicholas – April 19, 2014

=== Season 6 ===
1. Ice-T and Coco Austin – April 8, 2020
2. Terry Bradshaw – April 15, 2020
3. Paula Abdul – April 22, 2020
4. NeNe Leakes – April 29, 2020
5. Kelly Osbourne – May 6, 2020
6. Taye Diggs – May 13, 2020

== Celebrity Ghost Stories UK ==
In 2011, the UK version of BIO broadcast a series of Celebrity Ghost Stories featuring UK celebrities. The show largely follows the same format as the original American version.

=== Series 1 ===
1. Terry Nutkins, Yvette Fielding, Nancy Sorrell and Jan Leeming – May 12, 2011
2. Margi Clarke, Mike Read, Kim Woodburn and Rav Wilding – May 26, 2011
3. Tina Malone, Jilly Goolden, Edwina Currie and Jeremy Edwards – June 2, 2011
4. John McCririck, Terri Dwyer, Sarah Cawood and Lembit Öpik – June 9, 2011
5. Anne Diamond, Pat Sharp, Amanda Lamb and John Altman – June 16, 2011
6. Toyah Willcox, Alex Ferns, Adele and Sue Cook – June 23, 2011

== See also ==
- List of ghost films
- Famously Afraid, television show on Travel Channel which also features celebrities and their paranormal stories
