= JackEL =

Jack Edward Lozeron
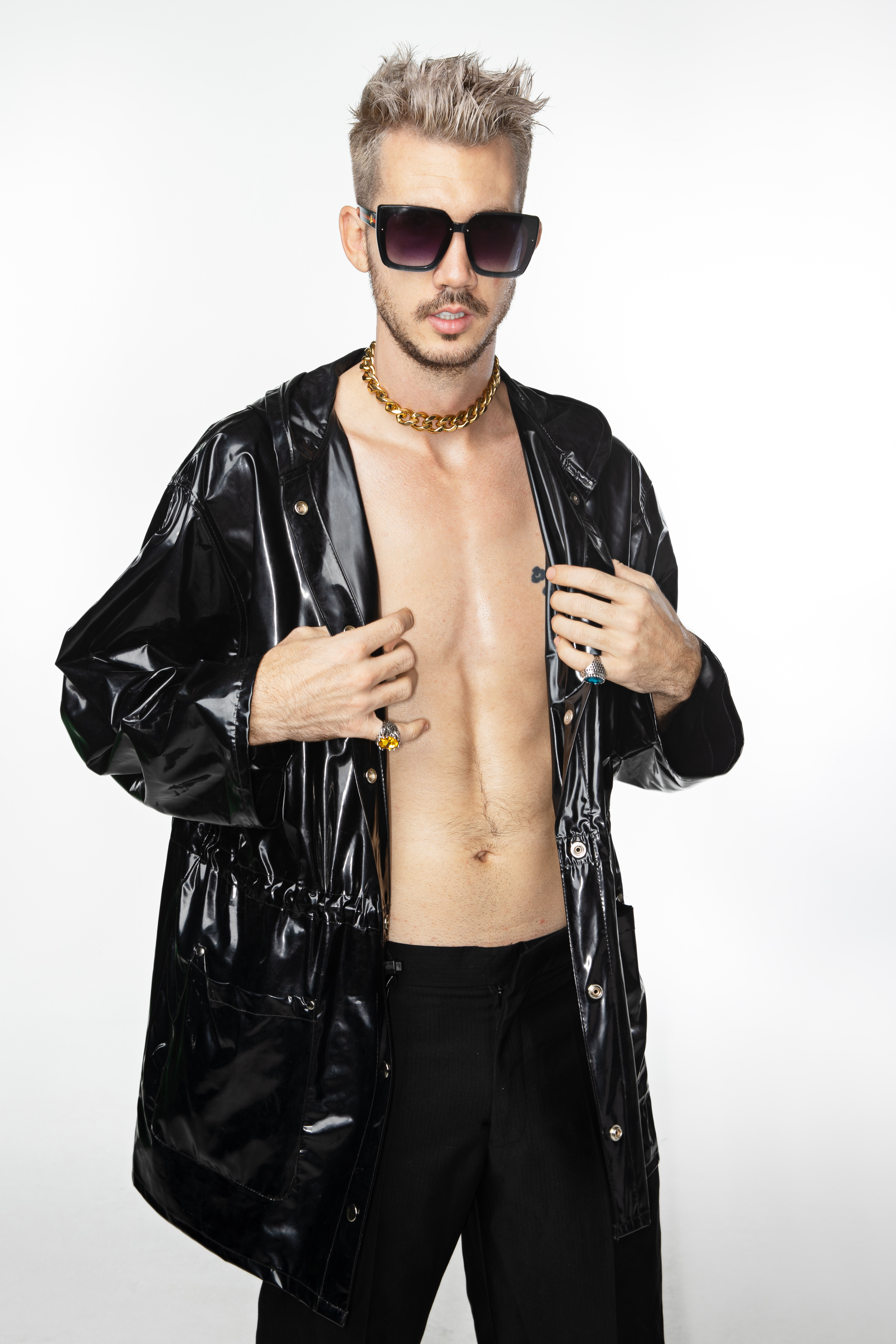

Background information
- Also known as: JackEL
- Born: Jack Edward Lozeron; September 9, 1996 (age 29)
- Origin: Edmonton, Alberta, Canada
- Genres: Electronic dance music
- Occupation: Disc jockey
- Years active: 2010–present

Jack Edward Lozeron (born September 9, 1996), known professionally as JackEL, is a Canadian DJ, record producer and songwriter. He is most notable for a collaboration with Skip Martin on an album titled EDM Lounge and his performance at EDC Las Vegas in 2019.

== Early life and education ==
Lozeron grew up in Edmonton, Alberta, Canada. He also briefly lived in New Orleans as a child, where he would frequently watch street performers at Bourbon Street. He was inspired to play EDM by listening to Deadmau5's music. He began DJing in local venues such as the Starlite Room and the Chvrch of Joh in his hometown of Edmonton at the age of 14. At the age of 16, he moved to Las Vegas to pursue his music career.

== Career ==
JackEL released his first single at the age of 16, a collaboration with rapper Mims titled, "Too Young to Die."

JackEL was the featured artist in Sparx Entertainment's January 2015 "UNCENSORED" article series. In 2015, he also formed a duo with musician Nikki Phoenix, collaborating on tracks such as "Your Smile" and "Ballroom Zombie."

JackEL founded the record label FVYDID in 2016. JackEL and ZaZa Maree performed the song at the 350th Hunnypot Live event at The Mint music club in Los Angeles.

In 2017, JackEL collaborated with RV3RS and General Jah Mikey on the track "Rootz ". RV3RS also teamed with JackEL and Zaddy Babby on the track “Do It Again,” which was released in 2022. JackEL also opened for Afrojack at the Grave Digger's Ball 2017 in South Carolina. JackEL also collaborated with Trice Be Phantom Magnetiq on the song “Sunshine.”

In 2019, JackEL collaborated with Skip Martin on a 16-track album titled EDM Lounge. In the same year, he collaborated with JAYKØ and Steezy Wundr on the bass house song “High as a Mafk.” He also released a remix of the Foster the People song “Imagination,” the dubstep song “Viens,” (a collaboration with Co$tly & $pace€adet) and a remix of the song “3 Nights” by Dominic Fike. He also released a remix of Lil Peep and XXXTentacion’s posthumous collaboration, “Falling Down.”

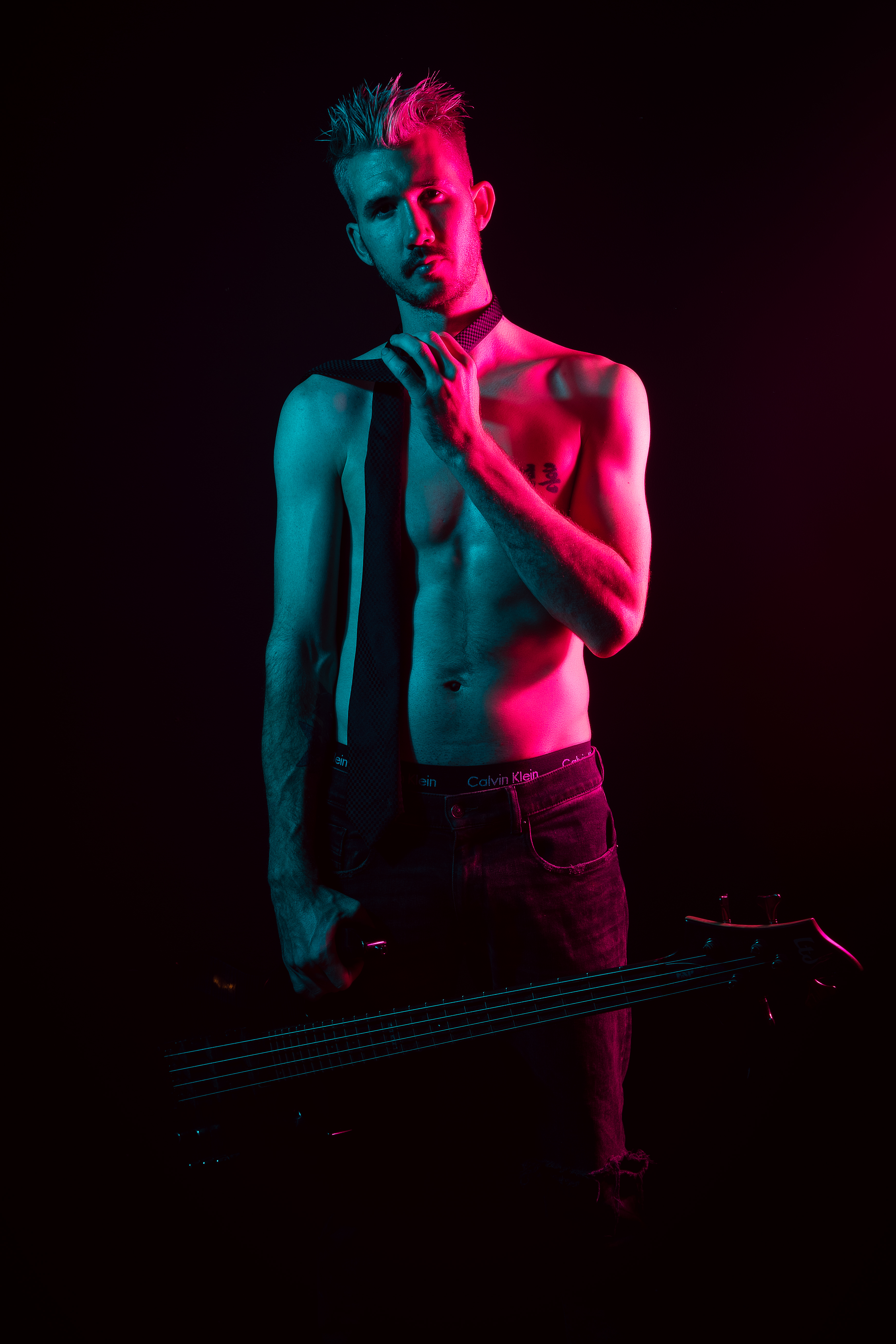
JackEL in 2022

He also performed at Electric Daisy Carnival Las Vegas in 2019.

JackEL also collaborated with Anthony Oak and Trice Be on the track "NØ MØRE" (2020). He also collaborated with Bobby Duque and Britt Lari on the single “Get This Right.”

JackEL contributed the track "Feel the Love" to Hood Politics Records' compilation album Hood Poli Summer of Love in July 2021. JackEL collaborated with rapper Slicklife on the song “Cutt the Check and with Las Vegas-based rapper Androjinni on the single “Can Not Stop Me,” for which he sampled the song “Creep” by TLC. He also released the single “Eyes.” JackEL was also one of the artists who performed at the 2021 Canadian Music Week music festival.

JackEL also performed at the Neon Dream Dance Music Festival in Las Vegas in 2022. DJ and production duo Eflorem released an official remix of JackEL's song “We Belong” in 2022. JackEL also released a collaboration with Yo Quiero Silla titled “Happy Fucking Holiday” in December 2022.

In May 2023, JackEL released a remix of the single “Bight Me” by Master Pocketz. In the same month, JackEL played a DJ set at the Sapphire Pool & Dayclub in Las Vegas. In 2023, he also released the singles “All I Wanna Do,” “Fly Away,” and “Heaven or Hell.”

Other artists JackEL has worked with include Mims and Beenie Man. He also produced two records for rapper Dizzy Wright.
