= ZaZa Maree =

American singer, songwriter and music producer

- Born: Anastasia Malaguti; Greenville, North Carolina
- Occupations: Singer; songwriter
- Years active: 2011 - Present

Anastasia Malaguti, known professionally as ZaZa Maree, is an American singer, songwriter, and music producer.

== Career ==
Malaguti began her music career at the age of 14, when she created the rap-pop duo Cash & ZaZa with former The Cab bassist Cash Colligan. The duo released two official singles, "Mirror" and "Hahalujah", before she moved to a solo career. She released her debut EP "#Forever" in 2013, with three singles and their instrumental counterparts, which she co-wrote and co-produced.

Shortly after releasing the EP, she was asked to write a song for the TV show Raising Asia, Ray’s Dance Moms spinoff on the Lifetime network. With a production team which included Fame star Billy Hufsey, Maree co-wrote five of the songs sung by Ray in the first season of Raising Asia. JackEL also released the single "Just Fine," a collaboration with singer-songwriter ZaZa Maree that year. JackEL and ZaZa Maree performed the song at the 350th Hunnypot Live event at The Mint music club in Los Angeles.

Maree’s next two singles, "Go Back" and "Just Fine", were released in 2016, and her single "With You" was released on September 22, 2017. With You currently has 500,000 streams on Spotify. In 2014, she was featured on Rai Italia in her home recording studio.

Maree performed at the Carolina Country Music Festival in 2016, among a lineup which included Keith Urban, Jake Owen, and Maren Morris. She performed at Grave Diggers Ball later that year in Charlotte, North Carolina, with Marc E. Bassy and headliner Afrojack, and opened for Trina in Las Vegas.

== Personal life ==
Anastasia Malaguti is the daughter of professional poker player Flaminio Malaguti. She grew up in Las Vegas, Nevada, after moving from her hometown of Greenville, North Carolina at the age of 6. She started playing piano at age 4, and started singing and playing guitar at age 11. She performed cover versions of songs around Las Vegas as a child. She was Miss Nevada High School 2014.
