= The Haunting of... =

- Genre: Documentary
- Presented by: Kim Russo
- Country of origin: United States
- Original language: English
- No. of seasons: 6
- No. of episodes: 67

Production
- Executive producers: David McKillop; Devon Graham; Julie Insogna Jarrett; Laurie Sharpe; Seth Jarrett; Tom Moody
- Running time: 41 to 43 minutes
- Production company: Jarrett Creative Group

Original release
- Network: The Biography Channel (Seasons 1-2); Lifetime Movie Network (Season 3-)
- Release: October 27, 2012 – September 10, 2016

Related
- Celebrity Ghost Stories

The Haunting of… is an American documentary television series that premiered on October 27, 2012. The series aired its first two seasons on The Biography Channel prior to moving to Lifetime Movie Network beginning with its third. Hosted by Kim Russo, The Haunting Of... tells the stories of various celebrities who have agreed to tell their first-hand details of when the paranormal changed their lives forever. It is a spinoff of Celebrity Ghost Stories.

== Episodes ==
Season	Episodes	Originally released	
Season	Episodes	First released	Last released
1	7	October 27, 2012	December 22, 2012
2	8	June 1, 2013	July 20, 2013
3	8	October 19, 2013	December 14, 2013
4	17	January 4, 2014	November 15, 2014
5	26	February 28, 2015	December 3, 2015
6	9	March 28, 2016	September 10, 2016

=== Season 1 (2012) ===
No. overall	No. in season	Title	Original release date
1	1	"Beverley Mitchell"	October 27, 2012
2	2	"Eric Mabius"	November 10, 2012
3	3	"Connie Stevens"	November 17, 2012
4	4	"Kelly Carlson"	November 24, 2012
5	5	"Regis Philbin"	December 1, 2012
6	6	"Chazz Palminteri"	December 8, 2012
7	7	"Gina Gershon"	December 22, 2012

=== Season 2 (2013) ===
No. overall	No. in season	Title	Original release date
8	1	"Barry Bostwick"	June 1, 2013
9	2	"Elisabeth Röhm"	June 8, 2013
10	3	"Michael Rapaport"	June 15, 2013
11	4	"Fairuza Balk"	June 22, 2013
12	5	"Nadine Velazquez"	June 29, 2013
13	6	"Giancarlo Esposito"	July 6, 2013
14	7	"Rowdy Roddy Piper"	July 13, 2013
15	8	"Jay Thomas"	July 20, 2013

=== Season 3 (2013) ===
No. overall	No. in season	Title	Original release date
16	1	"Charles Shaughnessy"	October 19, 2013
17	2	"Carnie Wilson"	October 26, 2013
18	3	"Patrick Muldoon"	November 2, 2013
19	4	"Sally Struthers"	November 9, 2013
20	5	"Kim Carnes"	November 16, 2013
21	6	"D. B. Sweeney"	November 23, 2013
22	7	"Kristen Renton"	December 7, 2013
23	8	"Tito Ortiz"	December 14, 2013

=== Season 4 (2014) ===
No. overall	No. in season	Title	Original release date
24	1	"Bernie Kopell"	January 4, 2014
25	2	"Jack Blades"	January 11, 2014
26	3	"Coco Austin"	January 18, 2014
27	4	"Shirley Jones"	January 25, 2014
28	5	"Vanessa L. Williams"	June 21, 2014
29	6	"Vince Neil"	June 28, 2014
30	7	"Brett Cullen"	July 12, 2014
31	8	"Wayne Newton"	July 19, 2014
32	9	"Dot Jones"	July 26, 2014
33	10	"Joe Pantoliano"	August 9, 2014
34	11	"Michael Madsen"	August 16, 2014
35	12	"Valerie Harper"	August 23, 2014
36	13	"Christopher McDonald"	August 30, 2014
37	14	"Linda Dano"	September 6, 2014
38	15	"Tom Green"	November 1, 2014
39	16	"Jesse Metcalfe"	November 8, 2014
40	17	"Billy Ray Cyrus"	November 15, 2014

=== Season 5 (2015) ===
No. overall	No. in season	Title	Original release date
41	1	"Greg Grunberg"	February 28, 2015
42	2	"Tatum O'Neal"	March 7, 2015
43	3	"Richard Burgi"	March 14, 2015
44	4	"Kendra Wilkinson"	March 21, 2015
45	5	"Jordan Ladd"	March 28, 2015
46	6	"Illeana Douglas"	April 4, 2015
47	7	"Johnny Weir"	April 11, 2015
48	8	"Diane Farr"	April 18, 2015
49	9	"Loni Love"	May 30, 2015
50	10	"Lou Gossett Jr."	June 6, 2015
51	11	"Jonathan Bennett"	June 13, 2015
52	12	"Joanna Cassidy"	June 20, 2015
53	13	"Anthony Michael Hall"	June 27, 2015
54	14	"Audrina Patridge"	August 22, 2015
55	15	"Orlando Jones"	August 22, 2015
56	16	"Margaret Cho"	August 29, 2015
57	17	"Patti Stanger"	September 5, 2015
58	18	"T-Pain"	September 19, 2015
59	19	"Karina Smirnoff"	September 26, 2015
60	20	"Meat Loaf"	October 22, 2015
61	21	"Melody Thomas Scott"	October 22, 2015
62	22	"Travis Tritt"	October 29, 2015
63	23	"Harry Lennix"	November 5, 2015
64	24	"Alysia Reiner"	November 12, 2015
65	25	"Johnathon Schaech"	November 19, 2015
66	26	"Carole Radziwill"	December 3, 2015

=== Season 6 (2016) ===
No. overall	No. in season	Title	Original release date
67	1	"Kesha"	March 28, 2016
68	2	"Eric Roberts"	September 10, 2016
69	3	"Charisma Carpenter"	September 10, 2016
70	4	"Eric Dickerson"	September 10, 2016
71	5	"Kevin Sorbo"	September 10, 2016
72	6	"Eric Balfour"	September 10, 2016
73	7	"T-Boz"	September 10, 2016
74	8	"Ernie Hudson"	September 10, 2016
75	9	"Morgan Fairchild"	September 10, 2016

== Specials ==
Special No.	Title	Original release date
1	"Pennhurst Revisited"	February 1, 2014
2	"Creepiest Locations"	October 11, 2014
3	"Scariest Spirits"	October 18, 2014
4	"Revealed"	October 25, 2014
