= Chicken Girls =

American web series

- Genre: Teen drama
- Created by: Janey Feingold
- Starring: Jules LeBlanc; Hayden Summerall; Brooke Butler; Riley Lewis; Dylan Conrique; Madison Lewis; Indiana Massara; Aliyah Moulden; Carson Lueders; Rush Holland; Caden Conrique; Matthew Sato; Marlhy Murphy; Pilot Paisley-Rose; Donovin Miller; Avani Gregg; Hayley LeBlanc; Coco Quinn; Enzo Lopez; Corinne Joy; Elliana Walmsley; Kheris Rogers; Liam-Alexander Newman; Aidan Prince; Santiago Carrera; Skyler Aboujaoude; Mateo Gallegos; Txunamy Ortiz; Thaddeaus Ek
- Opening theme: "Birds of a Feather" by Annie LeBlanc, Brooke Butler, and Hayden Summerall
- Country of origin: United States
- Original language: English
- No. of seasons: 11
- No. of episodes: 148 (list of episodes)

Production
- Executive producers: Rob Fishman; Darren Lachtman; Kristen Lachtman; Billy LeBlanc; Nick Millman; Jimmy Summerall
- Camera setup: Single-camera
- Running time: 5–18 minutes
- Production company: Brat

Original release
- Network: YouTube
- Release: September 5, 2017 – October 31, 2023

Related
- Chicken Girls: College Years; Chicken Girls: The Docuseries; Rooney’s Last Roll; Chicken Girls: Forever Team

Chicken Girls is an American web series starring Jules LeBlanc, Hayden Summerall, Hayley LeBlanc, Brooke Butler, Riley Lewis, Indiana Massara, Madison Lewis, Aliyah Moulden, Rush Holland, Dylan Conrique, Caden Conrique, Carson Lueders, and more. The series, produced by Brat, premiered on YouTube on September 5, 2017 and ended on October 31, 2023.

The series is known for launching the careers of LeBlanc, Summerall, Butler, Massara, and more. A spinoff series, Chicken Girls: College Years, which follows Rooney and Birdie in college together, debuted online on August 2, 2022.

== Premise ==
Chicken Girls tells the story of middle school student Rhyme McAdams and her friends, Ellie, Quinn, and Kayla – known as "The Chicken Girls" – who have been dancing together forever. The show follows the girls as they navigate dance, friendship, crushes, and learning how to grow up. But as they begin their freshman year at Attaway High School (season 3), everything's changing.

In Season 7, Harmony has found her own squad of Chicken Girls. With the new girl group, the story focuses on backstabbing, secret-keeping and boy drama.

== Cast ==
=== Cast table ===
List indicator

This section includes characters who have appeared in Chicken Girls, Rooney's Last Roll, Chicken Girls: College Years, and Chicken Girls: Forever Team series with main role.

- An empty grey cell indicates the character was not in the season.

= Main cast (credited)
= Recurring cast (2+ episodes)
= Guest cast (1 episode)

Character	Portrayed by	Chicken Girls											Chicken Girls: College Years		Rooney's Last Roll	Chicken Girls: Forever Team
Character	Portrayed by	1	2	3	4	5	6	7	8	9	10	11	1	2	1	1
Rhyme McAdams	Jules LeBlanc	Main	Main	Main	Main	Main	Main	R	Guest	Guest						
Tommy "TK" Kaye	Hayden Summerall	Main	Main	R		G	M	R	R	G						
Ellie Mack	Brooke Butler	Main	Main	Main	Main	Main	Main	R	R							
Quinn Forrester	Riley Lewis	Main	Main	Main	Main	Main	Main	G	R				G			
Rooney Forrester	Indiana Massara	Main	Main	Main	Main	Main	Main	R	R							
Birdie Kaye	Madison Lewis	Main	Main	Main	Main	Main	Main	R								
Luna	Aliyah Moulden	Main	Main	Main	Main	Main	Main									
Flash	Rush Holland	Main	Main	Main	Main	Main	Main			G						
Kayla Seltzer	Dylan Conrique	Main	Main	Main	Main			G								
Tim Sharp	Caden Conrique	Main	Main	Main	Main											
Ace	Carson Lueders	Main	Main	Main	G					G						
Robbie Robbins	Matthew Sato		Main	Main	Main	Main	R									
Stephanie Stewart	Marlhy Murphy		R	Main	Main	Main	Main									
Ty Walker	Paul Toweh			Main	Main	Main	Main		G							
Wes	Donovan Miller					Main	Main	R								
Astrid Davison	Pilot Paisley-Rose					Main	Main	R								
Gemma	Avani Gregg						M									
Harmony McAdams	Hayley LeBlanc	Recurring	Recurring	Recurring	Recurring	Recurring	Recurring	Main	Main	Main					Recurring	
Brittany Diamond	Txunamy Ortiz		Guest	Guest				Main	Main							
Katie Miller	Coco Quinn					G		Main	Main							
Peyton "PK" Kaye	Enzo Lopez							Main	Main	Main	Main	Main				
Leyla	Skyler Aboujaoude							Main	Main	Main						
Gus	Santiago Carrera							Main	Main	Main						
Jordan	Matteo Gallegos							Main	Main							
Darnell Walker	Liam-Alexander Newman							Main	Main	Main						
Edward "Eggie" Kham	Aidan Prince							Main	Main	Main						
Bella "Bel" Bosker	Kheris Rogers							Main	Main	Main	Main	Main	Main			
Claire Fitzroy	Elliana Walmsley							Main	Main	Main	Main	Main	Main			
Simone Davis	Corinne Joy							R	Main	Main	Main	Main	Main			
Leo	Thaddeaus Ek								Main							
Kendall Jones	Sterling Monètt															
Chad	Hootie Hurley															
Chelsea	Riley Hubatka															

=== Main ===
- Jules LeBlanc as Rhyme McAdams (main, seasons 1–6; recurring, season 7; guest, seasons 8–9): Harmony's older sister, Ellie and Quinn's best friend, and Astrid's cousin
- Hayley LeBlanc as Harmony McAdams (main, seasons 7–9; recurring, seasons 1–6): Rhyme's 12-year-old sister, and Astrid's cousin. Unlike Rhyme, Harmony is quite feisty and is not afraid to speak her mind. She takes over as series lead in season 7. She starts her own Chicken Girls, which includes Claire, Bel and Leyla.
- Hayden Summerall as Tommy "T.K." Kaye (main, seasons 1–2, 6; recurring, season 3, 7–8; guest, season 5, 9): Rhyme's childhood friend, and later boyfriend
- Brooke Butler as Ellie Mack (main, seasons 1–6; recurring, seasons 7–8): Rhyme's, Quinn's and Kayla's best friend
- Riley Lewis as Quinn Forrester (main, seasons 1–6; guest star, season 7; recurring, season 8): Rhyme and Ellie's best friend since childhood and become best friends with Kayla when the girls are in middle school
- Indiana Massara as Rooney Forrester (main, seasons 1–6; recurring, seasons 7–8): Quinn's step sister and Birdie's best friend
- Madison Lewis as Birdie Kaye (main, seasons 1–6; recurring, season 7): TK's older sister and Rooney's best friend
- Aliyah Moulden as Luna (seasons 1–6): the former captain of the Power Surge dance team
- Rush Holland as Flash (main seasons 1–6, guest, season 9): TK's and Ace's best friend, and Kayla's former boyfriend. It is revealed by his father in season 2 that his real name is Frederick.
- Dylan Conrique as Kayla Seltzer (main, seasons 1–4; guest, season 7): A friend of Ellie where Ellie met in dance camp and become best friends with Rhyme and Quinn.
- Caden Conrique as Tim Sharp (seasons 1–4): the former editor in chief of Attaway Appeal, Kayla's cousin, and Rhyme's former boyfriend
- Carson Lueders as Ace (main, seasons 1–3; guest, season 4, 9): TK's and Flash's good friend. He moved to California between seasons 3 and 4 when he sold his and Flash's app called "'Sup" to an investor.
- Matthew Sato as Robbie Robbins (main, seasons 2–5; recurring, season 6): Ellie's on-off boyfriend. His mother is Robin Robbins, a famous music producer.
- Paul Toweh as Ty Walker (main, seasons 3–6; guest, season 8): Luna's boyfriend and Walker's elder brother
- Marlhy Murphy as Stephanie Stewart (main, seasons 3–6; recurring, season 2): Rooney's ex-girlfriend
- Donovin Miller as Wes (main, seasons 5–6; recurring, season 7): Astrid's co-worker
- Pilot Paisley-Rose as Astrid Davison (main, seasons 5–6; recurring, season 7): Rhyme's and Harmony's cousin
- Avani Gregg as Gemma (season 6)
- Coco Quinn as Katie (main, season 7–present; guest, season 5): Harmony's childhood best friend who is a member of the dance team.
- Txunamy Ortiz as Brittany Diamond (main, seasons 7–8; guest star, seasons 2–3): Harmony's childhood best friend, and a member of the dance team.
- Enzo Lopez as Peyton "PK" Kaye (season 7–11): TK's and Birdie's cousin
- Skyler Aboujaoude as Leyla (seasons 7–9) Harmony, Claire and Bel's best friend and is longtime friends with Darnell, Gus and Eggie.
- Santiago Carrera as Gus (seasons 7–9): a friend of Walker and Eggie
- Matteo Gallegos as Jordan (seasons 7–8): An 8th grader who briefly dated Harmony and had a love triangle with Harmony and Leo McCoy.
- Liam-Alexander Newman as Darnell Walker (seasons 7–9): Ty's younger brother. He is longtime friends with Eggie, Gua and Leyla.
- Aidan Prince as Edward "Eggie" Kham (seasons 7–9): the captain of the football team and is long time friends with Walker, Gus and Leyla and PK
- Kheris Rogers as Bella "Bel" Bosker (season 7–11): the current captain of Attaway Dance Team, and a chicken girl and is Harmony, Claire and Leyla's best friends
- Elliana Walmsley as Claire Fitzroy (season 7–11): an overachieving student, and a member of the chicken girl, and is Harmony, Leyla and Bel's best friends
- Corinne Joy as Simone (main, season 8–11; recurring, season 7): Harmony's former friend and the temporary captain of the new Power Surge
- Thaddeaus Ek as Leo (season 8): a theater kid, who plays the male lead in the school production of A Midsummer Night's Dream

=== Cast table ===
List indicator

This section includes characters who will appear or have appeared in.

- An empty grey cell indicates the character was not in the , or that the character's official presence has not yet been confirmed.

= Recurring cast (2+ episodes)
= Guest cast (1 episode)

Character	Portrayed by	Chicken Girls											Chicken Girls: College Years		
Character	Portrayed by	1	2	3	4	5	6	7	8	9	10	11	1	2	
Hamilton	Jeremiah Perkins	Recurring	Recurring	Recurring	Recurring										
Kimmie	Kelsey Lynn Cook	Recurring	Recurring	Recurring											
Bess	Erin Reese DeJarnette	Recurring	Recurring	Recurring											
Jade	Talin Silva	Recurring	Recurring	Recurring											
Monica Allen	Jenna Davis	R	R												
Sandy	Brenna D’Amico	R	R												
Henry Barnett	Greg Marks	R		R											
Miles	HRVY	R													
Laney Raymond	Caitlin Carmichael	R													
Sierra Raymond	Isabella Durham	R													
Robin Robbins	Holly Gagnier		R	R											
Mr. Forrester	Billy LeBlanc		R	R											
Principal Mathers	Steven Parker		G	R											
Tiffany Mack	Brooke Burke		R	R											
Autumn Miller	Lilia Buckingham		R												
Naomi	Olivia Espara		R												
Jules	Grant Knoche		R												
Paul	Christian Lalama		R												
Dru	Ariel Martin		R												
Holly	Aidette Cancino		R												
Frankie	Nathan Triska		R												
Babs	Brec Bassinger		R												
Bagel	Ben Azelart		R												
Edward	Andy Milder		R												
Lukas	Alex Stokes		R												
Roscoe	Alan Stokes		R												
Suzie	Paris Simone		R												
Billy Ridgeway	Cameron McLaeod		R												
Britney	Lily Chee			R	R	R									
Spike Smith	Sean Cavaliere			R	G	G									
Drake	Jay Ulloa			R	R										
Suzie Kaye	Heidi Kaufman														
Mel	Emma Maddock														
Molly McAdams	Tatiana Turan													Recurring	Recurring
Angie	Sissy Sheridan													Recurring	Recurring
Beatrice	Kaylyn Slevin													Recurring	Recurring
Becky 1	Isabelle Marcus													Recurring	Recurring
Becky 2	Josie Nivar													Recurring	Recurring
Sheryl Hutchins	Sarah Baker													Recurring	Recurring
Herschel Sparks	Billy Gardell													R	R
Peg	Nancy Linehan Charles													G	R
Brenda Sparks	Melissa Peterman													Recurring	Recurring
Glenn	Chris Wylde													Guest	Guest
John Sturgis	Wallace Shawn													Recurring	Recurring
Paige Swanson	Mckenna Grace														Recurring
Linda Swanson	Andrea Anders														R
Veronica Duncan	Isabel May														R
Officer Robin	Mary Grill														G
Dr. Grant Linkletter	Ed Begley Jr.														Recurring
Coach Dale Ballard	Craig T. Nelson														
Jana Boggs	Ava Allan														
Pastor Rob	Dan Byrd														
Fred Fagenbacher	Matt Letscher														
Chloe Costa	Kara Arena														
Beth	Casey Wilson														
Scott	Christopher Gorham														

==== Introduced in season 1 ====
- Jeremiah Perkins as Hamilton (seasons 1–4): Rooney's ex-boyfriend
- Kelsey Lynn Cook as Kimmie (seasons 1–3): a friend of Luna's and former member of the Power Surge dance team
- Erin Reese DeJarnette as Beth (seasons 1–3): a friend of Luna's and former member of the Power Surge dance team
- Talin Silva as Jade (seasons 1–3): a friend of Luna's and former member of the Power Surge dance team
- Jenna Davis as Monica Allen (seasons 1–2): a friend of Luna and former member of the Power Surge dance team. Her parents own Allen's Arcade. She is the granddaughter of Cathy Fitzroy and Allen Alvarez from A Girl Named Jo.
- Brenna D'Amico as Sandy (seasons 1–2): a friend of Ellie's and another member of Miles' band
- Greg Marks as Henry Barnett (seasons 1, 3): Rooney's former boyfriend
- HRVY as Miles (season 1): Ellie's former love interest
- Caitlin Carmichael as Laney Raymond (season 1): TK's former girlfriend
- Isabella Durham as Sierra Raymond (season 1): Laney's twin sister and a girl Ace briefly dated

==== Introduced in season 2 ====
- Holly Gagnier as Robin Robbins (seasons 2–3): a music producer in L.A. and ex-best friend of Miss McCallister, Ms. Mack, & Mrs. Sharpe. Her real name is Roberta Roach.
- Billy LeBlanc as Mr. Forrester (seasons 2–3): Rooney's father and Quinn's stepfather
- Steven Parker as Principal Mathers (seasons 2–3): the principal of Attaway High
- Brooke Burke as Tiffany Mack (seasons 2–3): Ellie's mother
- Lilia Buckingham as Autumn Miller (season 2): Luna and Birdie's rival and the captain of the Millwood Dance Team
- Olivia Espara as Naomi (season 2): a former member of the Attaway Dance Team
- Grant Knoche as Jules (season 2): Luna's childhood friend
- Christian Lalama as Paul (season 2): the manager for the Millwood Dance Team who develops a crush on Rhyme
- Ariel Martin as Dru (season 2): an employee at the Attaway Arcade
- Aidette Cancino as Holly (season 2): Ace's former crush. She works for the Attaway Appeal and it is revealed by Tim that she got Matilda (a character played by MaeMae Renfrow from another Brat show based on/named after Attaway Appeal) fired from the newspaper.
- Nathan Triska as Frankie (season 2): a former member of Attaway Dance Team, dubbed "Chicken Boy" by Rhyme, Quinn, Kayla, and Birdie
- Brec Bassinger as Babs (season 2): Flash's father's assistant, and Ace's crush. She is a struggling actress.
- Ben Alezart as Bagel (season 2): the captain of the Attaway school basketball team. In a different Brat show called Brobot, it is revealed that Bagel's real name is Bobby.
- Andy Milder as Edward (season 2): Flash's father, a famous movie producer who lives in Los Angeles
- Alex and Alan Stokes as Lukas and Roscoe (season 2): members of the Attaway school basketball team
- Paris Simone as Suzie (season 2): a former member of the Power Surge dance team
- Cameron McLaeod as Billy Ridgeway (seasons 2, 5): a member of the Attaway Appeal

==== Introduced in season 3 ====
- Lily Chee as Britney (seasons 3–5): one of the queen B's at Attaway High. She is a top student and journalist for the Attaway Appeal.
- Sean Cavaliere as Spike Smith (recurring, season 3; guest star, seasons 4–5): Birdie's ex-boyfriend
- Jay Ulloa as Drake (seasons 3–4): a theatre actor and Rhyme's ex-boyfriend
- Heidi Kaufman as Suzy Kaye (seasons 3–4): TK and Birdie's mother
- Emma Maddock as Mel (seasons 3, 5): Stephanie's ex-girlfriend
- Tatiana Turan as Molly McAdams (seasons 3, 5): Rhyme and Harmony's mother
- Sissy Sheridan as Angie (season 3): the self-titled "queen" of drama club until Rhyme joins
- Kaylyn Slevin as Beatrice (season 3): the leader of the queen B's at Attaway High
- Isabelle Marcus as Becky 1 (season 3): one of the queen B's at Attaway High
- Josie Nivar as Becky 2 (season 3): one of the queen B's at Attaway High
- Rebecca Zamolo as Mrs. Forrester (season 3): Quinn's mother, and Rooney's stepmother
- Luke Dodge as young T.K. (season 3)
- Trinity Valenzuela as young Rhyme (season 3, 8)

==== Introduced in season 4 ====
- Diezel Braxton as Arthur (seasons 4–5): a student at Attaway High
- Paul Thomas Arnold as Junior Chambers (season 4–present): the owner of Junior's. He is a recurring character across the Brat universe.
- William Franklyn-Miller as Ezra Grant (season 4): Rhyme's former crush, and classmate whom she met in Spring Breakaway.
- Kiana Naomi as Effie (season 4): a good friend of Rhyme's who attends Crown Lake. The two met in Spring Breakaway.
- Alex Guzman as Jax Brinkman (season 4): Britney's boyfriend
- Nataliz Jiménez as Elena (season 4): Ezra's abusive stepmother
- Dino Petrera as Billy (season 4): a kid who works for the Attaway Appeal

==== Introduced in season 5 ====
- Carter Southern as Isaac Jones (season 5): a member of Attaway High's football team. He is a main character in Zoe Valentine.
- Tariq Brown as Evan (season 5): a member of Attaway High's football team
- Kai Peters as Jesse Hawkins (season 5): a classmate of Rhyme and Wes's rival, also known as "The Falcon", which is his stage name for the Attaway radio station he runs
- Blaine Maye as Johnny Valentine (season 5): Robbie's cousin and River's friend. He stars in Dirt and also appears in Boss Cheer.
- Catherine Grady as Mrs. Henderson (season 5): the social studies teacher at Attaway High

==== Introduced in season 6 ====
- Chris Romero as Carlos (season 6): a member of Ellie's debate team
- Gigi Cesare as Tonya (season 6): a girl in Birdie, Rooney, Luna, and Ty's gym class
- Amelie Anstett as Sadie (season 6): TK's girlfriend back in Texas
- Anirudh Pisharody as Benji (season 6): Gemma's ex-boyfriend
- Kesley Leroy as Jessica (season 6): a member of the Attaway High cheer team

==== Introduced in season 7 ====
- Andrew Davis II as Mr. Giamarra (seasons 7–8): a reading and literature teacher for Harmony and her friends
- Sawyer Fuller as Portia (seasons 7–8): a worker at the Parlor Ice Cream Shop
- Ansa Woo as Tanya Kham (season 7): Eggie's mother who is best friends with Bel's mother
- Alyssa Gutierrez-Sierra as Star (season 7): Simone's teammate and Harmony's former friend

==== Introduced in season 8 ====
- Brooklyn Courtney-Moore as Margo (season 8–9): Leyla's friend and later rival and head editor of the junior appeal
- Lauren Rosa as Young Harmony (season 8)
- Ella Noel as Tamara (season 8)
- Mila Skye Rouse as Judy (season 8–9)
- Sir Cornwell as Ernie (season 8–9)
- Hailey Villarreal as Grace (season 8)

==== Introduced in season 9 ====
- Mehra Marzbani as Yasmina
- Tina Hohman as Emerson
- Adriana Camposano as Poppy

==== Introduced in season 10 ====
- Nicolette Peck as Ivy
- Lizzy Howell as Kara
- Raihyah as Bailey
- Ayumi Matsumoto as JJ
- Anna Mia Conley as Petra
- Meztli Quetzalcoatl as Theo
- Matthew Garbacz as Finn
- La'Ron Hines as Ben

== Episodes ==
Season	Episodes	Originally released	
Season	Episodes	First released	Last released
1	11	September 5, 2017	December 19, 2017
2	11	February 14, 2018	May 15, 2018
3	13	September 4, 2018	December 11, 2018
4	11	March 19, 2019	May 28, 2019
5	11	September 3, 2019	November 12, 2019
6	10	March 10, 2020	May 12, 2020
7	15	September 8, 2020	December 15, 2020
8	20	March 23, 2021	July 27, 2021
9	16	October 26, 2021	April 5, 2022
10	20	September 27, 2022	May 23, 2023
11	10	August 29, 2023	October 31, 2023

== Production and release ==
Production and filming for the series' first season commenced August 6, 2017. The series was first reported by Variety on August 21, 2017. Alana Johnson was originally cast a series regular, but she dropped the role to produce her own film. The second season premiered on February 14, 2018. In June 2018, Brat released Chicken Girls: The Movie which takes place between the second and third seasons of Chicken Girls. On August 9, 2018, The Hollywood Reporter announced season 3 would premiere on September 4, 2018.

The Brat Holiday Spectacular film, featuring Annie LeBlanc, Indiana Massara, Aliyah Moulden, Mackenzie Ziegler and other performers from Chicken Girls, along with cast from Total Eclipse and Boss Cheer, was released in December 2018. The film takes place between Chicken Girls season 3 and Spring Breakaway. In March 2019, Brat released the Spring Breakaway film, which stars Annie LeBlanc, Lilia Buckingham, Anna Cathcart, Kianna Naomi and William Franklyn Miller. This film takes place between Holiday Spectacular and Chicken Girls season 4.

The series was renewed for a fourth season, which premiered on March 19, 2019. In August 2019, Brat released the Intern-in-Chief film, which featured much of the Chicken Girls cast, notably Annie LeBlanc, Brooke Elizabeth Butler, Riley Lewis, and Kianna Naomi, with Indiana Massara, Hayley LeBlanc, Matt Sato, Rush Holland, Mads Lewis, and Aliyah Moulden appearing as well. The film takes place between the fourth and fifth seasons of Chicken Girls. The fifth season premiered on September 3, 2019. In November 2019, the series was renewed for a sixth season, which premiered on March 10, 2020.

In August 2020, Brat announced a new cast for the seventh season of Chicken Girls, which included Hayley LeBlanc, Coco Quinn, Txunamy Ortiz, and Corrine Joy from Mani, as well as Enzo Lopez, Elliana Wamsley, Matteo Gallegos, Michael Aboujaoude, Skyler Aboujaoude, Kheris Rogers, Aidan Prince, Santiago Carrera, and Liam-Alexander Newman. The season was originally set to premiere on September 1, 2020, but was pushed back to September 8. In 2020, a behind the scenes documentary series Chicken Girls: The Docuseries was released alongside season 7. Season 8 premiered on March 23, 2021. Season 9 premiered on October 26, 2021. Season 10 premiered on September 27, 2022. Season 11 premiered on August 29, 2023.

=== Filming ===
The main filming location for Chicken Girls, besides Brat Studios, is Ramona Convent Secondary School. It was used as the school in the series' first season, and in Chicken Girls: The Movie, as well for most of the fourth through sixth seasons.

== Reception ==
=== Viewership ===
Forbes reported that Chicken Girls and another Brat show, Total Eclipse, helped the network accumulate a "loyal audience" of 15 million unique viewers in three months that "the company is beginning to monetize by moving into advertising in 2019".

Chicken Girls: The Movie was the most viewed program on Brat of all time, having more than 41 million views as of March 7, 2025. The Brat Holiday Spectacular, featuring Jules LeBlanc (formerly Annie LeBlanc), Indiana Massara, Aliyah Moulden, Mackenzie Ziegler, other cast from Chicken Girls, other cast from Total Eclipse, and more has been viewed more than 7.9 million times as of March 7, 2025. The Spring Breakaway film has been viewed more than 9.7 million times, while the Intern-in-Chief film has been viewed more than 4.8 million times, as of March 7, 2025.

Last updated on March 7, 2025
Season	Number of views (first episode)	Number of views (last episode)
1	18,657,383	14,686,295
2	10,860,278	7,947,352
3	7,548,030	7,618,943
4	7,085,897	4,271,032
5	4,276,591	5,062,410
6	6,441,776	4,911,779
7	5,301,362	2,411,058
8	3,513,739	1,967,953
9	3,233,878	1,086,798
10	685,516	203,829
11	588,587	189,931

=== Awards ===
Year	Award	Category	Recipient/nominee	Result	Ref.
2018	Streamy Awards	Best Drama Series	Chicken Girls	Nominated	
2018	Streamy Awards	Best Acting in Drama	Annie LeBlanc	Nominated	
2019	Streamy Awards	Best Scripted Series	Brat	Nominated	
2019	Streamy Awards	Best Acting	Annie LeBlanc	Nominated	

== Spinoffs ==
The popularity of Chicken Girls has led the team at Brat TV to produce accompanying spinoff series to the show. The first series, Rooney's Last Roll, follows Rooney Forrester as she struggles to move on from her relationship with Stephanie after finding a film roll from the last time they were together. It premiered on November 11, 2020.

A second spinoff series, Chicken Girls: College Years, follows Rooney and Birdie as they start their new lives in college and encounter new challenges along the way. It premiered on August 2, 2022.

A third spinoff series, Chicken Girls: Forever Team, centers on Simone and her friends, who have to navigate their life with Harmony having moved away. It premiered on November 3, 2022.

Additionally, Chicken Girls: The Docuseries was a spinoff more focused on the cast and behind the scenes of season 7 (unlike the other straight-up spinoffs that take place within the show’s universe). It premiered on October 1, 2020.
