= Zoe Valentine =

Web series

- Genre: Teen drama
- Written by: Elisabeth Rogge
- Directed by: John Baumgartner
- Starring: Anna Cathcart; Diego Velazquez; Carter Southern; Josh Golombek; Josh Pafchek; Wes Armstrong; Debbie Fan; Mace Coronel; Brighton Sharbino; Bailey Sok; Hannah Spiros; Malik Barker; Lilia Buckingham
- Opening theme: "Please Don't Go" by Joel Adams
- Country of origin: United States
- Original language: English
- No. of seasons: 2
- No. of episodes: 15

Production
- Camera setup: Single-camera
- Running time: 10-14 minutes
- Production company: Brat

Original release
- Network: YouTube
- Release: January 16 – October 23, 2019

Zoe Valentine is an American web series produced and distributed by Brat. The series stars Anna Cathcart as the eponymous character. It also stars Diego Velazquez and Carter Southern. The series premiered on Brat's YouTube channel on January 16, 2019.

== Synopsis ==
=== Season 1 ===
Following the death of her older sister Cleo, Zoe Valentine is thrust into the upper echelon of Attaway High's social hierarchy. Caught between her old life and her sister's popularity, Zoe discovers herself and gets to know the sister she never really knew.

=== Season 2 ===
Zoe struggles with her love life after her break up with her former boyfriend Milo Vargas. Keeping information from each other causes tensions between Zoe and her friend Brody Clemens especially after Viv Anderson, whom Brody is dating, and Riggs Williams, whom Zoe has taken a liking to, come into the picture.

== Cast ==
=== Main ===
- Anna Cathcart as Zoe Valentine, a high school freshwoman with an interest in stage magic
- Diego Velazquez as Brody Clemens, Zoe's best friend and fellow magic enthusiast
- Carter Southern as Isaac Jones, Cleo's boyfriend; he befriends Zoe after Cleo's death and is later revealed to be gay
- Josh Golombek as Kent Andrews, a patient who was in the hospital at the same time as Cleo and fell in love with her
- Josh Pafchek as Boots Botsman, a friend of Isaac and Milo's who hosts parties and makes insensitive jokes about being gay. He is a popular jock on the football team.
- Wes Armstrong as Tony Valentine, Zoe's father
- Debbie Fan as Brenda Valentine, Zoe's mother
- Mace Coronel as Milo Vargas (season 1), a friend of Isaac and Boots'; Zoe's love interest in Season 1. He is a jock on the football team.
- Brighton Sharbino as Allison Betts (season 1), Isaac's ex-girlfriend and Cleo's former rival
- Bailey Sok as Viv Anderson (season 2), Brody's new girlfriend. She is very talented in art and is passionate about the environment.
- Hannah Spiros as Raya Williams (season 2), a girl Zoe meets in math class who introduces her to tarot cards
- Malik Barker as Riggs Williams (season 2), Raya's adoptive brother
- Lilia Buckingham as Autumn Miller (season 2), a Millwood student Zoe met in Spring Breakaway; Zoe confides in her when she is unable to turn to Brody

=== Recurring ===
- Malia Tyler as Cleo Valentine, Zoe's older sister who died from cancer
- Nino Hara as Casper Valentine (main season 1; guest season 2), Zoe's brother
- Lauren Giraldo as Kiba (season 1)
- Lily Chee as Britney (season 1)
- Tariq Brown as Evan (season 2)
- Jacob Melton as Austin DuPont (season 2)
- Johnny Jay Lee as Elliot Fares (season 2)
- Lilia Buckingham as Autumn Miller (season 2)
- Kai Peters as Jesse (season 2)
- Paul Toweh as Ty Walker (season 2)

=== Guest ===
- Lauren Orlando as Kate Parker (season 2)
- Annie LeBlanc as Rhyme McAdams (season 2)
- Ireland Richards as young Cleo (season 2)
- Matthew Taylor as Ricky (season 2)

== Episodes ==
=== Series overview ===
Season	Episodes	Originally released	
Season	Episodes	First released	Last released
1	7	January 16, 2019	February 27, 2019
2	8	September 4, 2019	October 23, 2019

=== Season 1 (2019) ===
No. overall	No. in season	Title	Original release date
1	1	"Disappearing Act"	January 16, 2019
2	2	"Illusions"	January 23, 2019
3	3	"Three-Card Monte"	January 30, 2019
4	4	"Metamorphosis"	February 6, 2019
5	5	"The Best Coin Fold"	February 13, 2019
6	6	"Cabinet Escape"	February 20, 2019
7	7	"The Great Zoe Valentine"	February 27, 2019

=== Season 2 (2019) ===
No. overall	No. in season	Title	Original release date
8	1	"Fool"	September 4, 2019
9	2	"Death"	September 11, 2019
10	3	"Magician"	September 18, 2019
11	4	"Lovers"	September 25, 2019
12	5	"Hermit"	October 2, 2019
13	6	"Tower"	October 9, 2019
14	7	"Star"	October 16, 2019
15	8	"World"	October 23, 2019

== Production ==
In November 2018, it was announced Anna Cathcart would star in web series produced and distributed by the Brat network, Zoe Valentine. Production for the first season took place that December. Season 1 contained 7 episodes; the first episode premiered on January 16, 2019 on YouTube. It was announced in July 2019 that Zoe Valentine had been renewed for a second season with production taking place that same month. Season 2 premiered on September 4.

== Reception ==
=== Critical reception ===
Emily Ashby of Common Sense Media called the series a "thoughtful drama [that] explores serious themes with heart", described it as being "insightful and heartfelt" and described Zoe as being "positive model of kindness, respect, and loyalty", giving the series 4 out of 5 stars. The series was named a Common Sense Selection.

=== YouTube views ===
Last updated on September 1, 2021
Season	Number of views (first episode)	Number of views (last episode)
1	5.9+ million	2.3+ million
2	1.7+ million	1+ million
