= List of Chicken Girls episodes =

This is a list of episodes for the Brat TV web series Chicken Girls, which premiered on September 5, 2017. As of 2023, 138 episodes have been aired.

== Series overview ==
Season	Episodes	Originally released	
Season	Episodes	First released	Last released
1	11	September 5, 2017	December 19, 2017
2	11	February 14, 2018	May 15, 2018
3	13	September 4, 2018	December 11, 2018
4	11	March 19, 2019	May 28, 2019
5	11	September 3, 2019	November 12, 2019
6	10	March 10, 2020	May 12, 2020
7	15	September 8, 2020	December 15, 2020
8	20	March 23, 2021	July 27, 2021
9	16	October 26, 2021	April 5, 2022
10	20	September 27, 2022	May 23, 2023
11	10	August 29, 2023	October 31, 2023

== Episodes ==
=== Season 1 (2017) ===
The first season of the series, which introduces the original set of main characters: Rhyme, TK, Ellie, Quinn, Kayla, Birdie, Rooney, Harmony, Ace, Flash, Tim, and Luna. The first four episodes are named after days of the week.

No. overall	No. in season	Title	Original release date
1	1	"Monday"	September 5, 2017
On the first day of school, Rhyme McAdams and childhood friend, T.K. (who has a crush on Rhyme) walk to school. While walking, Rhyme talks about her hopes getting on to the dance team this year while T.K. would be on the swim team. Meanwhile at Attaway Middle School, Rhyme’s best friends, Ellie Mack and Quinn Forrester wait for their friend to arrive. It is here we learn that the three of them call themselves “The Chicken Girls” and that all three of them hope to get onto the dance team. Ellie then introduces Quinn to her new friend, Kayla, whom she met at dance camp. Quinn immediately grows suspicious of Kayla which intimidates Ellie’s new friend. We also learn about Ellie’s obsession over boys and major crush on Henry, the ex-boyfriend of Quinn’s stepsister, Rooney. After arriving late to class, Rhyme meets up with Ellie and Quinn in English. Ellie then tells Rhyme about her new friend, Kayla who would also be trying out for the dance team. When hearing this, Rhyme grows nervous knowing that there are only three spots on the dance team.
2	2	"Tuesday"	September 12, 2017
At dance team tryouts, Quinn, Ellie, Rhyme, & Kayla perform a number for the dance team captains, Rooney Forrester (Quinn’s stepsister) and Birdie Kay (T.K.’s older sister). After the four friends finish their routine, Rooney and Birdie announce that the three new members of the team are Kayla, Ellie, and Quinn. Disappointed, Rhyme leaves. Just as she is leaving, she is approached by Tim Sharp, Kayla’s cousin and a writer for the school newspaper. The two immediately take a liking to each other and after a short talk, go their separate ways. Afterwards, Rhyme meets up with T.K. and tells him about Tim causing T.K. to feel jealous. Rhyme then tells T.K. about not making the team. Seeing her sadness, T.K. invites Rhyme to the Attaway Arcade for Birdie’s birthday party which she accepts. At the party, Kayla, Ellie, and Quinn are dressed up in their new dance team hoodies. All of a sudden, The Chicken Girls’ favorite song pops up (“Birds of a Feather”) causing Ellie, Rhyme, and Quinn to perform their friendship dance.
3	3	"Wednesday"	September 19, 2017
Ellie is still crazy over Henry much to the annoyance of her friends. Rooney, with her new hobby of photography, begins to drift away from the dance team. Due to several school newspaper meetings, Rooney misses a lot of dance team practices which irritates Birdie leading to a strain in the friends’ relationship. In an attempt to cheer her up, a student named Hamilton pranks Rooney by giving her a vomit-flavored jellybean, angering her even more. Rhyme tells T.K. about her thoughts of become the swim team manager in order to spend more time with him. With T.K. not thrilled with the idea, Rhyme leaves. Right after Rhyme leaves, Tim reaches out to T.K. informing him about his plans to ask Rhyme out. Panicking, T.K. tells Tim that she wouldn’t like him and says he’s “rudimentary”. Convinced that Rhyme was playing hard to get, Tim tells T.K. to ask her if she liked him. The next day, Ellie sees Henry walking to the bathroom and decides to follow him. Rooney decide to get revenge on Hamilton and brings gluten-free, dairy free cupcakes for her class. Knowing that Hamilton was allergic to both gluten and dairy, she gives Hamilton a specific cupcake incorporated with both things he is allergic to. Rhyme begins to feel distant from her friends with their busy dance schedules and talking about nothing but dance 24/7. Not wanting her friend to feel left out, Quinn asks Rhyme to help make posters for the pep rally that the dance team is performing in.
4	4	"Thursday"	September 26, 2017
Ellie follows Henry all the way to the bathroom when she notices that Henry smells like salt and vinegar chips. Just as they start to make out, Hamilton runs in and pukes as a result of Rooney’s prank. Hamilton begins to state his hate for Rooney only to realize that he is actually in love with her. T.K. looks at a Polaroid photo he took of Rhyme on the first day of school. Rhyme continues to make posters for the pep rally while T.K. apologizes for telling Tim Sharpe that she thought he was rudimentary. Growing impatient with Rooney missing practices, Birdie cuts her from the team and decides to take on Rhyme as a replacement. Just as T.K. is about to tell Rhyme about his feelings for her, Birdie pulls Rhyme out to inform her about the news. Quinn, upset about Rhyme replacing her stepsister tries to talk to Ellie who is so absorbed in texting Henry on Kayla’s phone (since she didn’t have her own). This makes her more upset at the fact that Ellie is now dating her stepsister’s ex-boyfriend. This leads to an argument between the two ending with Ellie telling Quinn that she was jealous that she didn’t have a boyfriend of her own. Not wanting to admit that Ellie had a point, Quinn stated that she was dating T.K. and briefly held his hand. At this moment, Rhyme walks in, seeing Quinn and T.K. holding hands, making her storm off. On her way out, she ran into Tim once again whom asked her out on a date. Rhyme accepted, returning to the gym for the pep rally. Rooney realizing that she was replaced leaves. After the pep rally, Rhyme is still angry at T.K. for dating Quinn without telling her. Despite T.K.’s attempt at explaining the truth, Rhyme still didn’t care.
5	5	"Halloween"	October 31, 2017
After the events of the last episode, Rhyme & T.K. hadn’t talked to each other. Rhyme became more busy with the dance team while T.K. moved on and made new friends, one of them being a girl-obsessed party guy, Ace. At dance practice, Birdie becomes more tough and strict with the team with the Regional Holiday Dance Meet in only two months. It is here we learn about Power Surge, the other Attaway dance team consisting of several semi-professional dancers. After practice ended, the girls talk about their plans for Ace’s Halloween party. Because of Rhyme’s plans for a partner’s costume with Ellie was changed, Birdie offers to do a partner’s costume with her, to which she accepts. T.K. reunites with his old friend Flash and the two quickly become close again much to the criticism of Ace. At the party, Birdie and Rhyme come as salt and pepper while Ellie and Henry dress up as Danny and Sandy. Quinn arrives at the party with Power Surge and doesn’t talk to her friends the whole night. The party doesn’t go well for Rhyme and Ellie with Birdie unsuccessfully teaching Rhyme how to act and Henry sticking to his phone. Eventually, Rooney shows up to the party and dresses up as pepper ending with her and Birdie reconciling. Meanwhile, Ellie and Rhyme leaves the party and decide to watch a scary movie instead.
6	6	"Next Crush"	November 7, 2017
Rhyme is feeling upset about her and T.K. drifting apart and talks to her sister, Harmony. Harmony tells Rhyme that she shouldn’t let go of T.K. and that he could still be a part of her life if she just tried. At the pool, Ace talks to the Raymound twins, Lainey and Sierra, and realizes that Lainey is into T.K. When Ace tells T.K. about this, he concludes that T.K. still likes Rhyme and says to be cool around her. When T.K. tried this however, it only confused Rhyme even more. While Ellie is texting Henry on Kayla’s phone, she finds out that Kayla and Henry are hiding something from her. This enrages Ellie and leads to her ripping her dance hoodie. She sees a member of the school band named Miles practicing his guitar in a classroom. It is then that Ellie realizes that she has moved on from Henry and now has feelings for Miles (“Next Crush”). Hearing Ellie’s voice, Miles invites Ellie to perform at his concert, Rock Your Hair. Finding out that the concert is at the same time as the Dance Expo, she is reluctant to do so. Noticing that Ellie’s hoodie was ripped, Miles gives her his to which she gladly accepts. While Birdie and Rooney are hanging out at the Forrester home, Quinn walks in with Luna, the captain of Power Surge. Quinn admits that she joined Power Surge, infuriating Rooney and Birdie.
7	7	"Photograph"	November 14, 2017
Rhyme rants about the drama going on in her life to Harmony. She talks about how T.K. is now dating Lainey, Quinn has betrayed her for the second time, Ellie’s head is in the clouds, and Tim is asking her out too much. At dance practice, Birdie tells the team that even though they are down a player, doesn’t mean they can’t win. She also announces that T.K. will be the new team manager. Ellie is still mad at Kayla and won’t speak to her only saying to “ask Henry”, which confuses Kayla. At the Attaway Arcade, Birdie feels like a third wheel when with Rooney and Hamilton, now dating, forcing her to hang out with T.K., Ace, and Flash. Birdie believes that Ace is a bad influence on T.K. because of how girl-obsessed he is. She tells T.K. to act more like his best friend Flash. T.K. responds stating that Flash wasn’t his best friend, causing Flash to leave. T.K.’s relationship with Lainey is very awkward and Rhyme realizes her feelings for T.K. Because of this, she begins to drift apart from Tim and distances herself from him. At home, Rhyme tells Harmony about her feelings for T.K. (“Photograph”)
8	8	"Broken"	November 21, 2017
The Dance Team begins to struggle with one person down. With the Dance Expo coming up, the Attaway Dance Team doesn’t know what to do and decides to use Rooney’s zoom lens to steal Power Surge’s moves. When Birdie and Rooney get back, Ellie protests which as a result, kicks her out of practice. Rhyme eventually finds out and tells Kayla and Birdie that Ellie is planning on going to Rock Your Hair. Once Ellie, gets to the concert, she decides not to sing, against Miles’s insistence that she sing. At the Dance Expo, Birdie panics over Ellie not showing up. Unfortunately for the Attaway Dance Team, Power Surge performs their number first. As a result of this, the performance wasn’t only disastrous, but proved that the moves were copied. After the Expo, Rhyme gets the address of the concert and arrives there. Rhyme encourages Ellie to perform and finally agrees. (“Broken”) After her performance, Miles asks Ellie to sing in his band.
9	9	"Say Anything"	November 28, 2017
Due to the school newspaper, Rooney and Hamilton are not able to hang out as much anymore. The Dance Team tried to practice harder even though they now only have three members. Birdie Blair’s Kayla for the team falling apart because Ellie was not talking to Kayla. She tells Kayla to make amends with Ellie and to get her back on the team. Kayla first confronts Henry and asks him if he knew anything. Henry shows Kayla the texts that Ellie had seen which Kayla realizes is the reason why Ellie is so mad. Ace, Flash, and T.K. plan to watch all the Star Wars movies projected on a screen. Quinn begins to struggle with the hard-core training she must take on on Power Surge. Birdie tries to take Quinn back, but Luna doesn’t allow it. Ellie is with Miles when Kayla pulls Ellie out to talk to her. Kayla tells Ellie that she is sorry for texting Henry behind her back, but it is not what she thinks. Ellie tells Kayla that she is moving on from dance and wants to focus on her singing career. Kayla tells Ellie that she was covering for Henry and Rooney after seeing the two of them kissing after Henry attempted to get back with Rooney. Henry’s attempt however was unsuccessful for Rooney has now moved onto Hamilton.
10	10	"Stronger in Numbers"	December 5, 2017
At the Attaway Arcade, Tim tries to kiss Rhyme, but she gets nervous and spits soda all over his face. Rhyme sees T.K. and his girlfriend Lainey at the arcade and is immediately disgusted. At dance practice, Kayla, Rhyme, T.K., and Rooney find out that Birdie forfeit Regionals. Not wanting Power Surge to win by default, the friends head over to Birdie’s house. The friends try to encourage Birdie, but she doesn’t budge. Ellie and Miles are practicing the band’s new song when Kayla asks Ellie for help. Reluctantly, Ellie agrees. Miles, Ellie, and Kayla try to devise a plan for Ellie to attend both the concert and dance meet. After a while, Miles comes up with an idea. Rhyme is still confused and has no one to talk to except Harmony. Harmony tells Rhyme that there will always be positive aspects in change. This encourages Rhyme to make amends with Quinn. When Rhyme goes over to the Forrester house, Quinn and Rhyme talk to each other about how they both felt that they moved on from each other. However, they admitted that they missed each other and are birds of a feather. After the two reconcile, Quinn gives Rhyme T.K.’s Polaroid photo from the first day of school.
11	11	"Two Places at Once"	December 19, 2017
Now that Quinn and Rhyme are friends again, they inform each other about all the drama that’s been happening in their own shoes. Quinn admits that she never dated T.K. and that he was just helping her stand up to Ellie. Rhyme says that she is confused about her feelings and never thought that anything would come between her and T.K. Quinn says that she cannot go back to the Attaway Dance Team because Luna would kill her. However, Rhyme convinces Quinn that the Chicken Girls belong together and are birds of a feather. Because of this, Quinn is motivated and quits Power Surge. Kayla, Ellie, and Miles start working out their plan. Tim is worried that Rhyme is no longer into him, but Kayla just tells him that she’s not used to this type of thing. At the Regional Holiday Dance Meet, Ace and Flash get into a fight and Ace makes T.K. pick. Meanwhile, the dance team stresses out whether Ellie will be able to make it or not. As Rooney and Hamilton walk into the theatre, Henry gets upset and claims Rooney as his own. Henry then tells Hamilton of the time Kayla caught he and Rooney together but makes it sound bad. Because of this, Hamilton gets upset and leaves, angering Rooney. Only a couple minutes before the performance and Ellie still didn’t show up. The team started to consider going on without Ellie but Kayla tells them not to. Rhyme agrees and says that the Chicken Girls dance together. In order to kill time, T.K. dresses up as a chicken and dances on stage after telling Rhyme “You’re lucky I love you”. Ellie got up on stage and along with the band (“Wave”) while the Attaway Team performed their routine. Turns out, the plan was to sing at the dance competition. The Attaway Dance Team eventually wins the competition and Rhyme asks T.K. if he meant what he said backstage.

=== Season 2 (2018) ===
Robby Robbins is introduced this season, as a main character. Monica is still a recurring character, but plays a bigger role than she had during season 1 in the first 5 episodes of the season. This season also introduces Frankie and Naomi, 2 new members of Attaway Dance Team who are recurring characters that only appear in this season.

No. overall	No. in season	Title	Original release date
12	1	"Thyme"	February 14, 2018
Power Surge dancer Monica is devastated to learn her grandmother is sick and may no longer be around. She tells Monica about the Attaway Arcade she has owned for decades and hopes she will do whatever she can to save it from being sold. Monica tearfully promises her grandmother she will save the arcade. After the concert sometime ago, Ellie reveals to Kayla and that she broke up with Miles. Rooney talks about Hamilton to Birdie and Quinn and how she doesn't know if he will forgive her for Valentine's Day. Tim visits Rhyme as he acknowledges it is their 3 month anniversary since they started a relationship, and presents her with a necklace. But Rhyme still has feelings for T.K. after remembering his words at the concert where he said he "loves" her. Monica eventually reveals to Power Surge and the Chicken Girls that the arcade is being sold to investors, and they agree to put their differences aside to help save it. T.K., Flash, and Ace plan a trip to Los Angeles after learning Flash's dad is a film director. Rhyme, Harmony, and Ellie fly to Los Angeles to support Ellie's chance at meeting a music producer to launch her career.
13	2	"Gone West"	February 20, 2018
14	3	"Surf’s Up"	February 27, 2018
15	4	"Always a Catch"	March 6, 2018
16	5	"Save The Arcade"	March 13, 2018
17	6	"Ace’s Party"	April 3, 2018
18	7	"More The Merrier"	April 10, 2018
19	8	"Girl Time"	April 17, 2018
20	9	"Diner Dates"	April 24, 2018
21	10	"Seven Minutes In Heaven"	May 1, 2018
22	11	"State"	May 15, 2018

=== Season 3 (2018) ===
Each episode is named after a musical. T.K. is bumped down to a recurring character. Drake, Ty, and Spike are added as main characters.

No. overall	No. in season	Title	Original release date
23	1	"Bring It On"	September 4, 2018
24	2	"If/Then"	September 11, 2018
25	3	"My Fair Lady"	September 18, 2018
26	4	"Next to Normal"	September 25, 2018
27	5	"Mamma Mia"	October 2, 2018
28	6	"Dirty Rotten Scoundrels"	October 9, 2018
29	7	"Anything Goes"	October 16, 2018
30	8	"Little Shop of Horrors"	October 30, 2018
Note: this was the 1st ever Brat episode to be aired by a YouTube live premiere
31	9	"Wicked"	November 6, 2018
32	10	"Catch Me If You Can"	November 13, 2018
33	11	"Bye Bye Birdie"	November 20, 2018
34	12	"Rodeo & Juliet"	November 27, 2018
35	13	"Footloose"	December 11, 2018

=== Season 4 (2019) ===
This is the season in which the character Ezra Grant, now a main character in the series, is introduced. Effie is also added as a new character. This is the only season where T.K. does not appear at all. Ace and Spike are now guest stars. As of this season, all of The Bs and Power Surge are gone except for Luna and Britney who are still on the show. The season's original air date was March 12, 2019 but was pushed back to March 19.

No. overall	No. in season	Title	Original release date
36	1	"Flour Babies"	March 19, 2019
37	2	"Flew the Coop"	March 26, 2019
38	3	"The Future Is Female"	April 2, 2019
39	4	"The Stench"	April 9, 2019
40	5	"Cancelled"	April 16, 2019
41	6	"You’re Invited"	April 23, 2019
42	7	"Teacher Takeover"	April 30, 2019
43	8	"No Escape"	May 7, 2019
44	9	"Battle of the Classes"	May 14, 2019
45	10	"Mr. Attaway"	May 21, 2019
46	11	"Sincerely, Rhyme"	May 28, 2019

=== Season 5 (2019) ===
This is the season where Astrid and Wes are now main characters. Jesse is also added as a new character. Spike is a guest star once again, and TK guest stars near the end where he reveals he is staying for good.

No. overall	No. in season	Title	Original release date
47	1	"The Other Guy"	September 3, 2019
48	2	"You're Hired"	September 10, 2019
49	3	"Great Debate"	September 17, 2019
50	4	"Game Day"	September 24, 2019
51	5	"Pinky Promise"	October 1, 2019
52	6	"The Trenches"	October 8, 2019
53	7	"Houseguests"	October 15, 2019
54	8	"Someone Else"	October 22, 2019
55	9	"Three Knocks"	October 29, 2019
56	10	"Profound Romantic Undertones"	November 5, 2019
57	11	"Fun and Glory"	November 12, 2019

=== Season 6 (2020) ===
TK returns as a main character. Gemma is added as a main character. Carlos, Tonya, Sadie, Jessica, and Benji are added as recurring characters. Robby is now a recurring character but despite appearing in 3 episodes, he only has 1 in-person appearance in the entire season (which is his 3rd and final appearance in the season), and his voice is only heard rather than him being seen in his 2nd appearance in the season.

No. overall	No. in season	Title	Original release date
58	1	"Resolutions"	March 10, 2020
59	2	"Cheer Up"	March 17, 2020
60	3	"Spin The Bottle"	March 24, 2020
61	4	"Unlucky"	March 31, 2020
62	5	"Never Have I Ever"	April 7, 2020
63	6	"Auditions"	April 14, 2020
64	7	"Movie Magic"	April 21, 2020
65	8	"Powder Puff"	April 28, 2020
66	9	"Senior Prank"	May 5, 2020
67	10	"Fly So High"	May 12, 2020
Here in this episode TK reunites with Rhyme at graduation, while all the others plan and hold the graduation party.

=== Season 7 (2020) ===
PK, Claire, Jordan, Leyla, Gus, Bel, Darnell, and Eggie are introduced this season as the new main characters (alongside Harmony, Brittany, and Katie). The season's original premiere date was September 1, 2020 but was pushed back to September 8.

No. overall	No. in season	Title	Original release date
68	1	"First Day"	September 8, 2020
69	2	"Boy Troubles"	September 15, 2020
Note: Rhyme's first absence.
70	3	"Group Project"	September 22, 2020
71	4	"Pep Rally"	September 29, 2020
72	5	"Girls’ Day"	October 6, 2020
73	6	"Team Manager"	October 13, 2020
74	7	"Chowder Bake"	October 20, 2020
75	8	"Over The Rainbow"	October 27, 2020
76	9	"Truce"	November 3, 2020
77	10	"A Girl Named Claire"	November 10, 2020
78	11	"Hey Harmony"	November 17, 2020
79	12	"Operation Spider"	November 24, 2020
80	13	"Breakfast Club"	December 1, 2020
81	14	"Regionals"	December 8, 2020
82	15	"Attaway Day"	December 15, 2020

=== Season 8 (2021) ===
With Rhyme and her friends all grown up, Harmony has found her own squad of Chicken Girls. But with all their new interests, secrets and crushes, can this girl group survive middle school?

No. overall	No. in season	Title	Original release date
83	1	"The Burn"	March 23, 2021
Spring semester gets off to a tumultuous start when The Chicken Girls and Power Surge face off at dance tryouts.
84	2	"Decisions, Decisions"	March 30, 2021
Harmony and Bell contemplate about their futures while Claire faces an unexpected challenger in her campaign. Leyla meets a new friend at the Appeal.
85	3	"Leo's Return"	April 6, 2021
While Leo McCoy's return to Attaway stirs up plenty of drama; Claire and PK disagree about campaign strategy and Harmony searches for a new extra-curricular.
86	4	"Wacky Wednesday"	April 13, 2021
When Belle is embarrassed by Power Surge, she finds an unlikely ally in Leo. Meanwhile, Harmony and Jordan's relationship is tested when Harmony joins the drama club.
87	5	"Campaign Speeches"	April 20, 2021
The election heats up after Claire's disastrous campaign speeches leaves Eggie in the lead. Harmony makes a hard choice to save her relationship.
88	6	"All Is Fair in Love and Politics"	April 27, 2021
Harmony frets about her first stage kiss with Leo while Claire resorts to dirty politics to pull ahead of Eggie in the election.
89	7	"Bake Sale"	May 4, 2021
The drama club starts a bake sale and gets more than they bargained for when secrets come to the surface. Leyla makes an unexpected connection.
90	8	"The Understudy"	May 11, 2021
Bell finds a new calling while Leyla and Harmony grapple with the events of the bake sale. And as the play gets closer, shake ups at the rehearsal have everyone on edge.
91	9	"The Debate"	May 18, 2021
Whether it's romantic tension or passionate disagreement, all the drama comes to head when Leyla confronts Simone and Claire and Eggie face off at the debates.
92	10	"Midsummer"	May 25, 2021
The drama club performs but the real drama happens offstage. Eggie and Simone make a decision about their future, while Leo faces a crossroads.
93	11	"Rough Start"	May 28, 2021
Harmony hopes to make Rhyme's last night before cheer camp perfect, but Rhyme has other plans. Meanwhile, Eggie struggles with his feelings for Claire, and a new girl in Attaway stirs up trouble.
94	12	"On the Hunt"	June 1, 2021
With their eyes set on Los Angeles, the Chicken Girls are on the hunt for summer jobs. Bel meets a cute boy at the country club and a surprising new coworker might turn Leyla off ice cream forever.
95	13	"Working Girls"	June 8, 2021
While Harmony has her hands tied up with the Hansons, Leyla butts heads with her new coworker and Claire and Bel struggle to fit in at Crown Lake.
96	14	"Dangerous Waters"	June 15, 2021
As Bel navigates the unwritten rules of the country club, Leyla navigates work with Simone- and a difficult decision. Meanwhile, Harmony realizes the Hansons may be more complicated than they seem.
97	15	"Secrets and Sleepovers"	June 22, 2021
Leyla and Harmony plan a fun day for Judy while Claire bonds with Grace and fantasizes about her past. And though Katie and Simone think Tamara's up to no good; she's definitely not the only one with a secret.
98	16	"Significant Others"	June 29, 2021
99	17	"Rites and Revelations"	July 6, 2021
100	18	"Truth and Lies"	July 13, 2021
101	19	"Los Angeles"	July 20, 2021
102	20	"The Ball"	July 27, 2021

=== Season 9 (2021–22) ===
In season 9, new characters Poppy, Emerson and Yasmina are introduced. On December 14, 2021, Brat TV released the mid-season finale of season 9. The remainder of season 9 was released from February to April, 2022.

This would also mark Harmony's last season as a major character on the series, making her the last character to have any direct connection with the series’ original cast dating back to Season 1.

No. overall	No. in season	Title	Original release date
103	1	"New Kids On The Block"	October 26, 2021
104	2	"Investigative Reporting"	November 2, 2021
105	3	"Under Pressure"	November 9, 2021
106	4	"Hot Off the Press"	November 16, 2021
107	5	"The Break In"	November 23, 2021
108	6	"Fall Out"	November 30, 2021
109	7	"The Big Game"	December 7, 2021
110	8	"No Place Like Home"	December 14, 2021
111	9	"Selling Attaway"	February 15, 2022
112	10	"Fresh Faces"	February 22, 2022
113	11	"Material Girls"	March 1, 2022
114	12	"Nothing Stays The Same"	March 8, 2022
115	13	"Change Can Be Good"	March 15, 2022
116	14	"Forget Me Not"	March 22, 2022
117	15	"Everybody Hurts"	March 29, 2022
118	16	"So Long"	April 5, 2022

=== Season 10 (2022-23) ===
No. overall	No. in season	Title	Original release date
119	1	"Spin, Ballerina"	September 27, 2022
120	2	"Real Player"	October 4, 2022
121	3	"In or Out"	October 11, 2022
122	4	"Second Try"	October 18, 2022
123	5	"Keeping a Secret"	October 25, 2022
124	6	"Team!"	November 1, 2022
125	7	"Better Off"	November 8, 2022
126	8	"Play Pretend"	November 15, 2022
127	9	"Misstep"	November 22, 2022
128	10	"The Key"	November 29, 2022
129	11	"Just Your Type"	March 21, 2023
130	12	"Cover Blown"	March 28, 2023
131	13	"Traitor"	April 4, 2023
132	14	"It's Personal"	April 11, 2023
133	15	"Miracles"	April 18, 2023
134	16	"The Exposé"	April 25, 2023
135	17	"Plan B"	May 2, 2023
136	18	"Regionals"	May 9, 2023
137	19	"Onward"	May 16, 2023
138	20	"Long Live"	May 23, 2023

=== Season 11 (2023) ===
In season 11, the episode titles are in a different format than the previous 10 seasons.

No. overall	No. in season	Title	Original release date
139	1	"Revealing her biggest secret"	August 29, 2023
140	2	"She Backstabbed Her BFF"	September 5, 2023
141	3	"She Caught Her Boyfriend LYING!"	September 12, 2023
142	4	"Teen Gets WORST Dating Advice"	September 19, 2023
143	5	"She Took PILLS To Study!"	September 26, 2023
144	6	"Nervous Girl SCARED For FIRST KISS"	October 3, 2023
145	7	"Using Magic To Get Her BF Back"	October 10, 2023
146	8	"Mean Girls RUIN Her Birthday Party"	October 17, 2023
147	9	"Girl Goes Viral, Gets Bullied For It"	October 24, 2023
148	10	"Chicken Girls’ Secrets Exposed"	October 31, 2023
