= Indiana Massara =

Australian singer, actress, model, and Internet personality (born 2002)

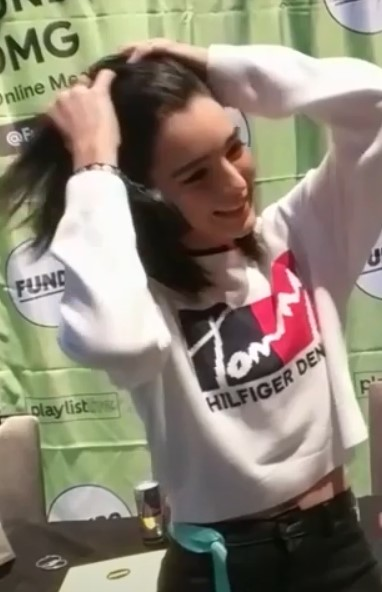
- Massara in 2020

Background information
- Born: Indiana Marie Ella Massara; 23 August 2002 (age 23); Perth, Western Australia, Australia
- Genres: Pop; synth-pop
- Occupations: Singer; actress; model; Internet personality
- Years active: 2015–present

YouTube information
- Channel: Indiana
- Subscribers: 414 thousand
- Views: 27.3 million
- Last updated: 6 July 2024

Indiana Marie Ella Massara (born 23 August 2002), sometimes shortened to just Indiana, is an Australian singer, actress, model, and Internet personality. Massara has been named one of Kiss FM's youngest New Next Up Artists.

== Early life and education ==
Massara was born in Coolbinia, a suburb of Perth, Western Australia. She is of Italian descent. Massara was a "tom-boy" as a child with an interest in sports. She initially stayed in Australia with her grandparents while her parents and older brother Presley left for Los Angeles so he could pursue acting. Indiana attended Mercedes College in the City of Perth before making the decision to join them.

== Career ==
Massara walked the Los Angeles Fashion Week runway at the age of 13.

Massara began working with Brat in 2017 when she landed the role of Rooney Forrester in Chicken Girls, a character she would also play in various series and films for the network such as Attaway Appeal, Chicken Girls: The Movie, Holiday Spectacular, Intern-in-Chief, the lead in Rooney's Last Roll, as well as cameos in Total Eclipse and Stuck. She also hosted Brat Chat alongside Darius Marcell and performed the theme song for Red Ruby, "Run You Down".

Massara released her debut single, "Drama" featuring Stoppa, in 2017, which made it into the top ten chart on Radio Disney. She has been in the top three on Radio Disney multiple times as well as receiving radio play in the United States, Australia, and Canada. Massara has released several singles including "Smoke In My Eyes", "In Your Dreams", "Do Yourself A Favour" and "Apology" featuring 24hrs in 2018 and "That Day", "I Think We're Alone Now" in 2019, and "Squeeze" in 2020. As of 2018, she was working on an EP.

In October 2018, Massara went on her first ever tour alongside Tayler Holder, Zach Clayton, and Joey Birlem with Swipe Up Live in Australia. Massara opened for Why Don't We, Bryce Vine, and Ava Max at 103.7 KISS-FM's Kiss the Summer Hello in June 2019.

In June 2020, Massara started a podcast with her friends Zach Justice and Jared "JareBear" Bailey titled Dropouts. A number of public figures have featured on the podcast as guests, such as Josh Peck, Brighton Sharbino, Paris Berelc, Nick Turturro, and Mike E. Winfield. In 2022, Massara joined the Broken Road podcast.

Massara played Paige in the 2021 film Hero Mode. Massara also played Jess in 2023 film The Crusades.

== Artistry ==
Massara takes inspiration from Sza, Khalid, Jack & Jack, and Beyonce. Her early inspirations include Elvis Presley and Frank Sinatra.

== Discography ==
=== Singles ===
- "Drama" featuring Stoppa (2017)
- "Smoke in my Eyes" (2018)
- "Do Yourself a Favour" (2018)
- "In Your Dreams" (2018)
- "Apology" featuring 24hrs (2018)
- "I Think We're Alone Now" (2019)
- "That Day" (2019)
- "Over It" (2019) with Jules LeBlanc and Aliyah Moulden
- "Run You Down" (2019), Red Ruby theme song
- "Say It Back" (2019)
- "Squeeze" (2020)
- "Brainstorm" (2021) from Hero Mode
- "Hopeless" (2022) with Illy

=== Music videos ===
Year	Song	Director
2018	"Smoke in My Eyes"	James Toth
2018	"Do Yourself a Favor"	James Toth
2018	"In Your Dreams"	James Toth
2018	"Apology"	Reel Mike Jones
2019	"I Think We’re Alone Now"	Nayip Ramos
2019	"That Day"	Reek Mike Jones; David Madison
2019	“Over It”	Brat
2019	“Run You Down”	Brat
2020	"Squeeze"	Éli Sokhn

== Filmography ==
=== Television ===
Year	Title	Role	Notes
2015	Sh!t Happens	Indi	Episode: "Trouble Maker"
2015	Connect	Sami Conrad	Episode: "Uh...Hi"
2015	Saturated	Abigail	Episode: "Nightcap"
2017–2021	Chicken Girls	Rooney Forrester	Main role (season 1–6); recurring (season 7–8)
2017	Attaway Appeal	Rooney Forrester	Main role
2018	Total Eclipse	Rooney Forrester	Episode: "Happy Birthday"
2018	Brat Chat	Herself	Main role
2019	Single Parents	Britney	Episode: "Welcome to Hell, Sickos!"
2019	Stuck	Rooney Forrester	Episode: "A Different Day"
2020	Rooney's Last Roll	Rooney Forrester	Main role
2022	Chicken Girls: College Years	Rooney Forrester	Main role

=== Film ===
Year	Title	Role	Notes
2015	Crafty: Or (The Unexpected Virtue of the Girl in Charge of Snacks	Kendall	Short film
2018	Chicken Girls: The Movie	Rooney Forrester	
2018	Holiday Spectacular	Rooney Forrester	
2019	Brat's Happy Death Day 2U	Rooney Forrester	Short film
2019	Intern-in-Chief	Rooney Forrester	
2021	Hero Mode	Paige	
2023	The Crusades	Jess	
