= Please Don't Go (Joel Adams song) =

Single by Joel Adams
- Released: 2 November 2015
- Recorded: 2015
- Length: 3:30
- Label: Will Walker Records
- Songwriter: Joel Adams
- Producers: Joel Adams, Derek Fuhrmann

Music video
- "Please Don't Go" on YouTube

"Please Don't Go" is a 2015 song by an Australian singer songwriter Joel Adams. The song was released on 2 November 2015 and has peaked at number 55 in Australia. This is Joel Adams' debut single. The song charted all over the world, proving especially successful in Sweden where it peaked at #6 and Norway at #11.

"Please Don't Go" is the theme song of the 2019 Brat series Zoe Valentine.

== Background ==
In an interview with Girl.com.au, Joel said; "I wrote the song 4 years ago when I was fifteen at school. I remember it was performance week and each student had to write an original song and sing it for the class, but I had totally forgotten. So, I grabbed a guitar, sat down on some stairs about an hour before it was my go and just started frantically strumming chords and came up with all the melodies in about 12 minutes and then went in a few minutes later and pretty much winged it! I ended up finishing the song after that night and kind of kept it in my pocket until the right time came to jump in the studio and produce it."

== Critical reception ==
Mark Papadotos from Digital Journal said; "Overall, Joel Adams showcases a great deal of talent and charisma on "Please Don't Go." One can easily tell that he sings from the heart, and he maintains great control over his voice. His tone is crystalline and his lyrics are warm. He deserves to make it big in the contemporary pop music scene. His single garners an A rating."

== Performance ==
Joel performed "Please Don't Go" live on The Morning Show on 1 April 2016.

Joel performed "Please Don't Go - Live Studio Performance on his YouTube Channel "Joel Adams" on 12 March 2021.

== Music video ==
The official music video was directed by Chuong Vo and released on 23 December 2015. As of July 2025, the video had earned over 130 million views and 2.2 million likes.

== Track listings ==
Digital download
No.	Title	Length
1.	"Please Don't Go"	3:30

Digital download - A Cappella
No.	Title	Length
1.	"Please Don't Go"	3:26

Digital download - Remixes
No.	Title	Length
1.	"Please Don't Go" (Tschax remix)	3:50
2.	"Please Don't Go" (Norelli remix)	3:31

== Charts ==
=== Weekly charts ===
Chart (2015–16)	Peak position
Australia (ARIA)	55
Austria (Ö3 Austria Top 40)	58
Belgium (Ultratip Bubbling Under Flanders)	17
Belgium (Ultratip Bubbling Under Wallonia)	20
Canada (Canadian Hot 100)	54
Czech Republic (Singles Digitál Top 100)	25
Denmark (Tracklisten)	29
Ireland (IRMA)	34
Italy (FIMI)	56
Netherlands (Single Top 100)	59
Norway (VG-lista)	11
Slovakia (Singles Digitál Top 100)	30
Sweden (Sverigetopplistan)	6
Switzerland (Schweizer Hitparade)	54
UK Singles (OCC)	50
US Bubbling Under Hot 100 (Billboard)	17

=== Year-end charts ===
Chart (2016)	Position
Denmark (Tracklisten)	86
Sweden (Sverigetopplistan)	29

== Certifications ==
Region	Certification	Certified units/sales
Denmark (IFPI Danmark)	Platinum	90,000^{‡}
Italy (FIMI)	Platinum	50,000^{‡}
New Zealand (RMNZ)	2× Platinum	60,000^{‡}
United Kingdom (BPI)	Gold	400,000^{‡}
^{‡} Sales+streaming figures based on certification alone.

== Release history ==
Region	Date	Format	Version	Label	Ref.
Australia	2 November 2015	Digital download	Original	Will Walker Records	
Australia	16 February 2017	Digital download	A Cappella	Will Walker Records	
Australia	1 April 2017	Digital download	Remixes	Will Walker Records	
