= Dylan Conrique =

American singer, songwriter and actress (born 2004)

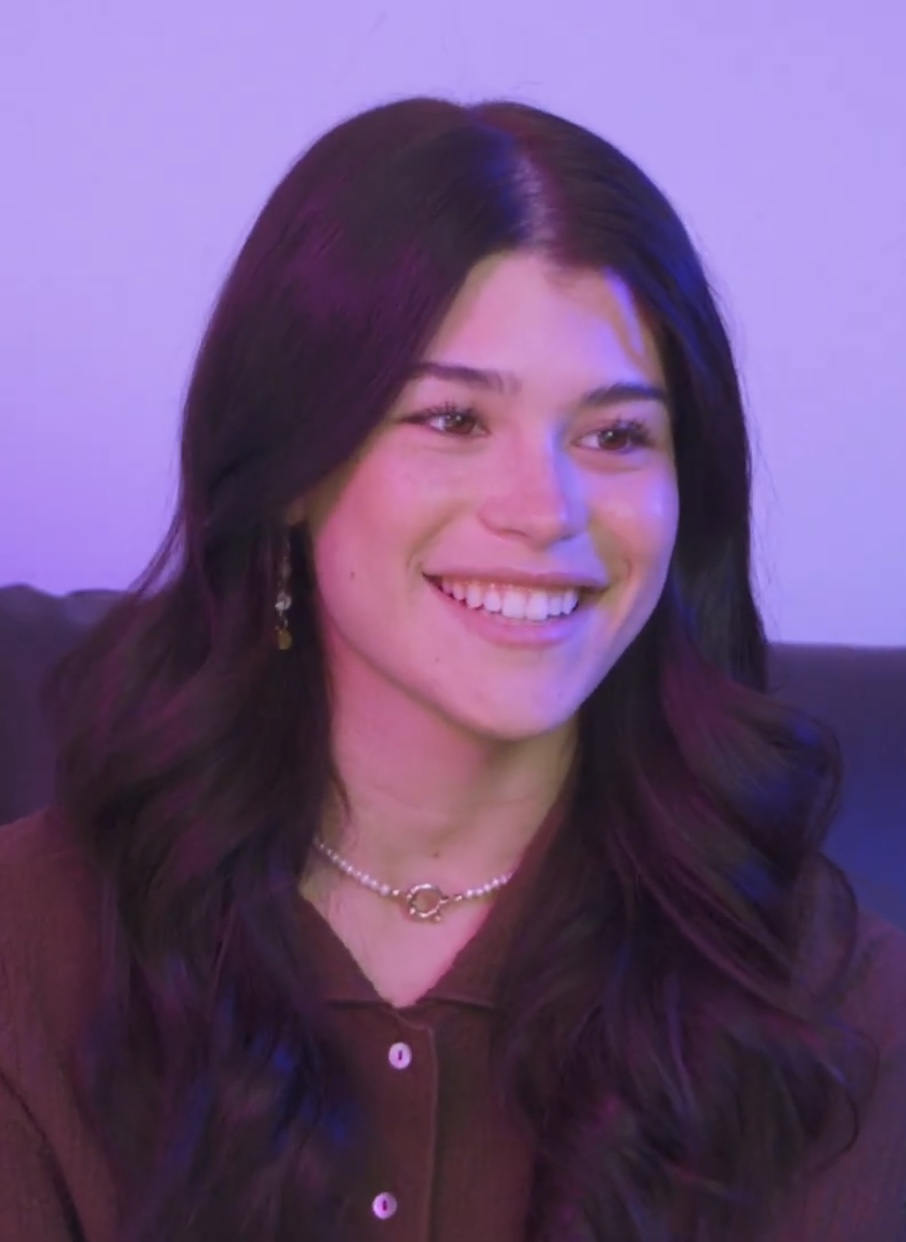
- Conrique in 2022
- Born: Dylan Shea Conrique; April 13, 2004 (age 22); Gilroy, California
- Occupations: Singer; Songwriter; Actress
- Years active: 2008–present
- Partner: Jett Lawrence
- Relatives: Caden Conrique (brother)
- Musical career
- Genres: Pop; Country
- Instruments: Vocal; Piano
- Label: KYN Entertainment
- Website: dylanconrique.com

Dylan Shea Conrique (born April 13, 2004) is an American singer, songwriter and actress. She began her career as an actress debuting in Chicken Girls (2017–2020) as Kayla Seltzer and in The Rookie (2021–2025) as Tamara Colins. In 2017, she started her singing career with her first original song, "Heartbeat". She debuted in 2022 with "Birthday Cake", which received the gold certification from the Recording Industry Association of America in June 2023.

== Early life ==
Dylan Shea Conrique was born in Gilroy, California on April 13, 2004. She was raised in Loomis where she took dance, acting and singing classes. At 11, she moved with her family to Los Angeles. Her older brother, Caden, is also an actor.

== Career ==
=== Acting ===
Conrique started acting at a young age. At the age of three, she appeared in The World's Astonishing News (2008–2014). Later, in 2016, she had appearances in the TV films Weird Wild Wonderful Days of School and House of Darkness. In 2017, Conrique made her acting debut when she leads a main role on the Brat's web series, Chicken Girls (2017–2020) as Kayla Seltzer. She reprised the role in Chicken Girls: The Movie in 2018. She also appeared in Henry Danger (2017). In 2021, Conrique was cast in the season 3 of The Rookie (2021–2025) to play Tamara Colins. In 2022, she played the young version of Sophia, played by Mishel Prada, in the short film, My Life Stopped at 15.

=== Music ===
Conrique released her first single, "Heartbeat", in April 2017. In August 2020, Conrique released her next singles, "Baby Blue" and "Wasted Makeup". In September 2020, she released the singles "Not So Secretly" and "Homesick". She also released her first EP, Baby Blue. In January 2021, she released the single "Bitter" along Noak Hellsing. In March 2021, she released her next single, "After All". Later, in July 2021, she released "Advice from the Internet". In February 2022, she released her debut single, "Birthday Cake". The song, which was written by her for a friend who lost her mom at 12 to cervical cancer, is a fundraiser for American Cancer Society. In June 2022, Conrique released "I Miss You (Skin to Skin)". In September 2022, she released her next single, "Get Over You". In November 2022, she released, "Ugly". In February 2023, she released "Gatekeeper". In April 2023, she released her next single "Pieces". In May 2023, she released her next singles, "Down from the High" and "Stick and Stones". Conrique also released her second EP, Pieces. In June 2023, "Birthday Cake" received the gold certification from the Recording Industry Association of America. In March 2024, Conrique released "Last One to Love Me". In September, 2025 she released "Written In Stone". In November, 2025 Conrique released the single "How To Lose The Girl". In January, 2026 she released "Polaroid". In April 2026 she released the single "A Little Like You".

== Discography ==
=== Extended plays ===
- Baby Blue (2020)
- Pieces (2023)

=== Singles ===
| Year | Title | Album |
|---|---|---|
| 2017 | "Heartbeat" | Non-album single |
| 2020 | "Baby Blue" | Baby Blue |
| 2020 | "Wasted Makeup" | Baby Blue |
| 2020 | "Not So Secretly" | Baby Blue |
| 2020 | "Homesick" | Baby Blue |
| 2021 | "Bitter" (featuring Noak Hellsing) (Note: This song appears at the beginning of episode 22 of season 4 in The Rookie when Tamara (played by her) is driving a car.) | Non-album singles |
| 2021 | "After All" | Non-album singles |
| 2021 | "Advice from the Internet" | Non-album singles |
| 2022 | "Birthday Cake" | Pieces |
| 2022 | "I Miss You (Skin to Skin)" | Non-album singles |
| 2022 | "Get Over You" | Non-album singles |
| 2022 | "Ugly" | Non-album singles |
| 2023 | "Gatekeeper" | Pieces |
| 2023 | "Pieces" | Pieces |
| 2023 | "Down from the High" | Pieces |
| 2023 | "Stick and Stones" | Pieces |
| 2023 | "When I Go" | Non-album singles |
| 2023 | "Never Change" | Non-album singles |
| 2024 | "Last One to Love Me" | Non-album singles |
| 2025 | "Written In Stone" | Non-album singles |
| 2025 | "How To Lose The Girl" | Non-album singles |
| 2026 | "Polaroid" | Non-album singles |
| 2026 | "A Little Like You" | Non-album singles |

== Filmography ==
| Year | Title | Role | Notes |
|---|---|---|---|
| 2008–2014 | The World's Astonishing News | Student | 2 episodes |
| 2016 | Weird Wild Wonderful Days of School | Dakota | Television film |
| 2016 | House of Darkness | Ruth's daughter | Television film |
| 2017 | Henry Danger | Piper's friend | 2 episodes |
| 2017 | Frolic N'Mae | | Short film |
| 2017–2020 | Chicken Girls | Kayla Seltzer | Main role (season 1–4); guest role (season 7) |
| 2018 | Chicken Girls: The Movie | Kayla Seltzer | |
| 2019 | The Kids Are Alright | Kathy Petrillo | Episode: Valentine's Day |
| 2021–2025 | The Rookie | Tamara Colins | Recurring role (season 3–season 7) |
| 2022 | My Life Stopped at 15 | Young Sophia | Short film |
