= Scott the Woz =

American video game review web series

- Logo used since 2017
- Genre: Gaming; Review; Surreal humor Editorial
- Created by: Scott Wozniak
- Directed by: Scott Wozniak
- Starring: Scott Wozniak; Sam Essig; Eric Turney; Dominic Mattero; Justin Womble; Joe Robertson; Jarred Wise
- Theme music composer: Garrett Williamson
- Ending theme: "Breakout" (seasons 1–5); "Break In" (season 6 – present)
- Composers: Nicholas Karr; Garrett Williamson; Tee Lopes; Hyper Potions; The 8-Bit Big Band
- Country of origin: United States
- Original language: English
- No. of seasons: 8
- No. of episodes: 278

Production
- Production locations: Toledo metropolitan area, Ohio
- Editor: Scott Wozniak
- Running time: 3–192 minutes

Original release
- Network: YouTube; G4 (2021–2022)
- Release: January 7, 2017 – present

Scott the Woz (stylized in start case) is a gaming review comedy web series created by and starring American YouTuber Scott Wozniak. Wozniak covers video game topics such as consoles, accessories, gaming history and subculture. Episodes are written and directed by Wozniak, with recurring characters played by his friends.

The first episode of Scott the Woz was released on YouTube in January 2017. Production is done under his own later-formed production company, Blue Border Entertainment. Scott the Woz is known for its philanthropic efforts, by selling limited edition merchandise, inducing an officially licensed version of the Monopoly board game, with fundraisers collectively raising over $1 million for charity. From 2021 to 2022, compilations of episodes were syndicated on the revival of the TV network G4.

Scott the Woz has received positive reception from video game journalists and writers, with critics praising the surrealist humor and writing. As of July 2026, the channel has over 2 million subscribers, with the series amassing a cult following. Wozniak also hosts a secondary channel, Scott's Stash, for unscripted content.

== Premise ==
Scott the Woz is a video game review web series, with a focus on discussion and retrospective of video games topics such as consoles, accessories, merchandise, history and subculture.

Most episodes adhere to a structure in which Wozniak explains or analyzes a video-game related topic, interspersed with cutaway skits and some recurring jokes. Some episodes deviate from this structure, and feature the video-game topic as interludes between scenes, or are simply just an extended skit with video-game references and themes. The show has recurring characters played by Wozniak's friends. Video game memorabilia are shown on his carpet.

These reviews feature his opinion on these products and companies (including criticism of faulty or misleading products), but are also often researched to present information about them. He draws from a large collection of game merchandise. The topic of his videos can vary from specific franchises and games like Super Mario and Sonic the Hedgehog to broader game genres and categories, like 3D gaming and console pack-in games.

== Cast and characters ==
- Scott Wozniak as Scott Wozniak
- Sam Essig as Jeb Jab
- Eric Turney as Rex Mohs
- Joe Robertson as Terry Lesler
- Dominic Mattero as Wendy's Employee / Target Employee / Police Employee
- Justin Womble as Jerry Attricks
- Jarred Wise as Officer Steel Wool
- Will Kanwischer as Chet Shaft
- Jeffrey Pohlman-Beshuk as Kay Swiss

Credits adapted from TV Guide.

== Series overview ==
=== Web series ===
| Season | Episodes | Originally released | |
| Season | Episodes | First released | Last released |
|---|---|---|---|
| 1 | 50 | January 7, 2017 | December 17, 2017 |
| 2 | 50 | January 21, 2018 | December 17, 2018 |
| 3 | 50 | January 30, 2019 | December 23, 2019 |
| 4 | 45 | February 9, 2020 | December 23, 2020 |
| 5 | 35 | March 21, 2021 | December 24, 2021 |
| 6 | 20 | May 22, 2022 | January 7, 2023 |
| 7 | 25 | June 1, 2023 | December 25, 2025 |
| 8 | 3 | May 27, 2026 | TBA |

=== Television episodes ===
Contents below are adapted from TV Guide.

| No. | Title | Original release date |
|---|---|---|
| 1 | "Episode 01" | December 7, 2021 |
Compilation of YouTube episodes "Plug and Play Games", "Pre-Orders", "Third Party Controllers", and "The Games That Time Forgot".
| 2 | "Episode 02" | December 14, 2021 |
Compilation of YouTube episodes "Mobile Games on Console", "Cross Generation Games", and "Special Edition Controllers".
| 3 | "Episode 03" | December 21, 2021 |
Compilation of YouTube episodes "Reboots", "The Great Mysteries of Gaming", and "Backwards Compatibility".
| 4 | "Episode 04" | December 28, 2021 |
Compilation of YouTube episodes "Game Show Games", "Lost in Localization", "Value Pack Games", and "Demakes".
| 5 | "Episode 05" | January 4, 2022 |
Compilation of YouTube episodes "Nintendo 64: Nintendo's Best Mistake", "Game Foods", and "The Rarest of Games".
| 6 | "Episode 06" | January 11, 2022 |
Compilation of YouTube episodes "Game of the Year Throughout the Years", "Game Boy Color: It Just Sorta Happened", and "Cheat Codes".
| 7 | "Episode 07" | January 18, 2022 |
Compilation of YouTube episodes "The Fall and Rise of 2D Gaming", "Rated E for Irrelevant", and "Wii Channels".
| 8 | "Episode 08" | January 25, 2022 |
Compilation of YouTube episodes "Instruction Manuals", "Used Games", and "Nintendo Before Video Games".
| 9 | "Episode 09" | February 1, 2022 |
Compilation of YouTube episodes "Game Controllers", "False Advertising", and "Console Gaming on the Go".
| 10 | "Episode 10" | February 8, 2022 |
Compilation of YouTube episodes "Game Stores", "From Developer to Defunct", "Game & Watch", and "Tech Demos".

== History ==
=== Background ===
Scott Wozniak
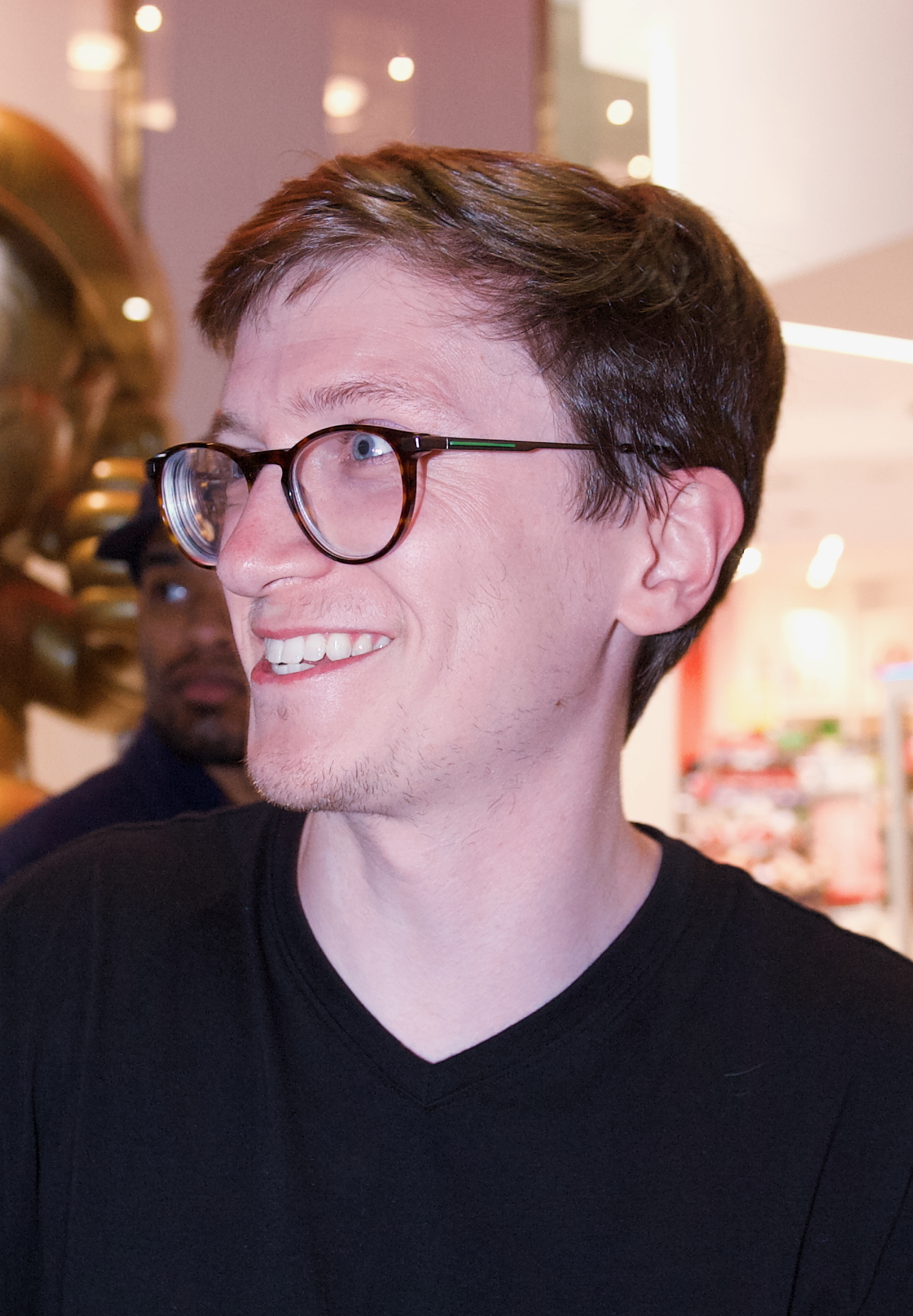
- Wozniak in 2025
- Born: Scott Daniel Wozniak; June 2, 1997 (age 29); Whitehouse, Ohio, U.S.
- Other name: Scott the Woz
- Occupations: YouTuber; filmmaker; comedian
- Years active: 2016–present

YouTube information
- Channel: Scott The Woz
- Genres: Gaming; review; comedy; editorial
- Subscribers: 2.04 million
- Views: 824 million
- Last updated: 9 November 2026

Scott Daniel Wozniak (born June 2, 1997) was raised in Whitehouse, Ohio. As a child, Wozniak uploaded videos to YouTube under the brand WozniakNews. They were based on his own creations, such as short stories, comics, and drawings. He ceased WozniakNews in 2012 due to low viewership. Wozniak returned to content creation when he was still attending Anthony Wayne High School, in his senior year of high school with The Internet and You, a 30-minute comedy YouTube video released in 2016, that features many of the same actors from Scott the Woz.

He intended for The Internet and You to be his final video, as he was unsure if he would continue to make videos. Wozniak eventually changed his mind, leading to the production of Scott the Woz. In 2017, he started uploading to the Scott the Woz YouTube channel, and by 2018 the channel hit 100,000 subscribers. He attended University of Toledo, but dropped out during his last semester.

=== Production ===
In 2020, he formed the company Blue Border Entertainment to help produce the show. In videos, Wozniak often displays video game titles and consoles on his carpet. In a 2022 tweet, Wozniak showed that to get the carpet shots, he would set up a table with a loose piece of carpet placed on top, with a camera mount over the top of it.

=== Release ===
Wozniak published the first episode of Scott the Woz on YouTube on January 7, 2017, focused on his opinions of the Nintendo Switch, before the console's January 12 presentation. The series maintained a consistent schedule of weekly videos until May 2022, when Wozniak announced that the series would run without schedule. In November 2024, Wozniak signed with the Creative Artists Agency. In September 2026, an official Japanese localization of the series was announced. The dub is produced by Denfaminico Gamer.

==== Syndication on G4 ====
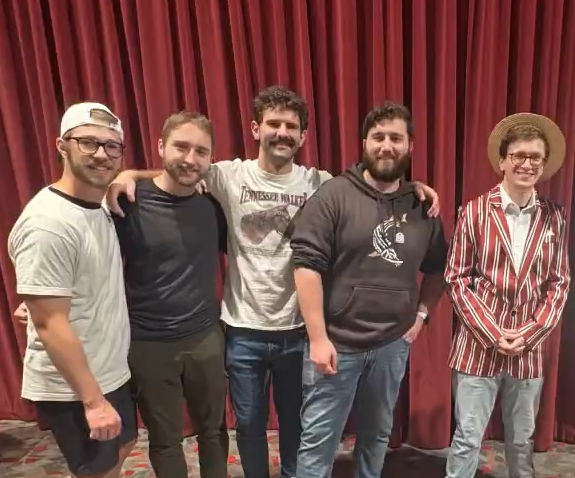
The Scott The Woz cast in 2025. From left to right: Dominic Mattero, Sam Essig, Justin Womble, Eric Turney, and Scott Wozniak

Scott The Woz was broadcast on the 2021 revival of TV network G4. Ten episodes, consisting of one-hour compilations of YouTube episodes, premiered from December 7, 2021, to February 8, 2022. The series was also featured on Pluto TV's G4 Select since March 2022.

=== Fundraising ===
Limited-edition merchandise themed around the show is offered once a year during the Merchandise for Charity Bonanza events held in collaboration with Pixel Empire (a gaming focused print on demand company), with all proceeds donated to Critical Care Comics and the Children's Miracle Network Hospitals. As of 2023, the fundraisers have collectively raised over $1,000,000. The events feature common items like T-shirts, posters, and more unique products, such as VHS releases of The Internet and You and a behind-the-scenes art book.

In 2020, Wozniak began to offer the Mysterious Game of Crypticism, a randomly chosen Nintendo Entertainment System (and later Super Nintendo Entertainment System and Sega Genesis) cartridge with a custom label to hide what game it was. On November 26, 2021, Wozniak announced Monopoly: Scott the Woz Edition, an officially licensed version of the Monopoly board game based on Scott the Woz. The game, produced in limited quantities, was sold via the Pixel Empire website as part of a charity fundraiser. In December 2022, he announced Clue: Scott The Woz Edition, a version of Clue based on the show. On June 6, 2025, Wozniak donated a brand-new Nintendo Switch 2 console to Nationwide Children's Hospital, just one day after the console released.

== Reception ==
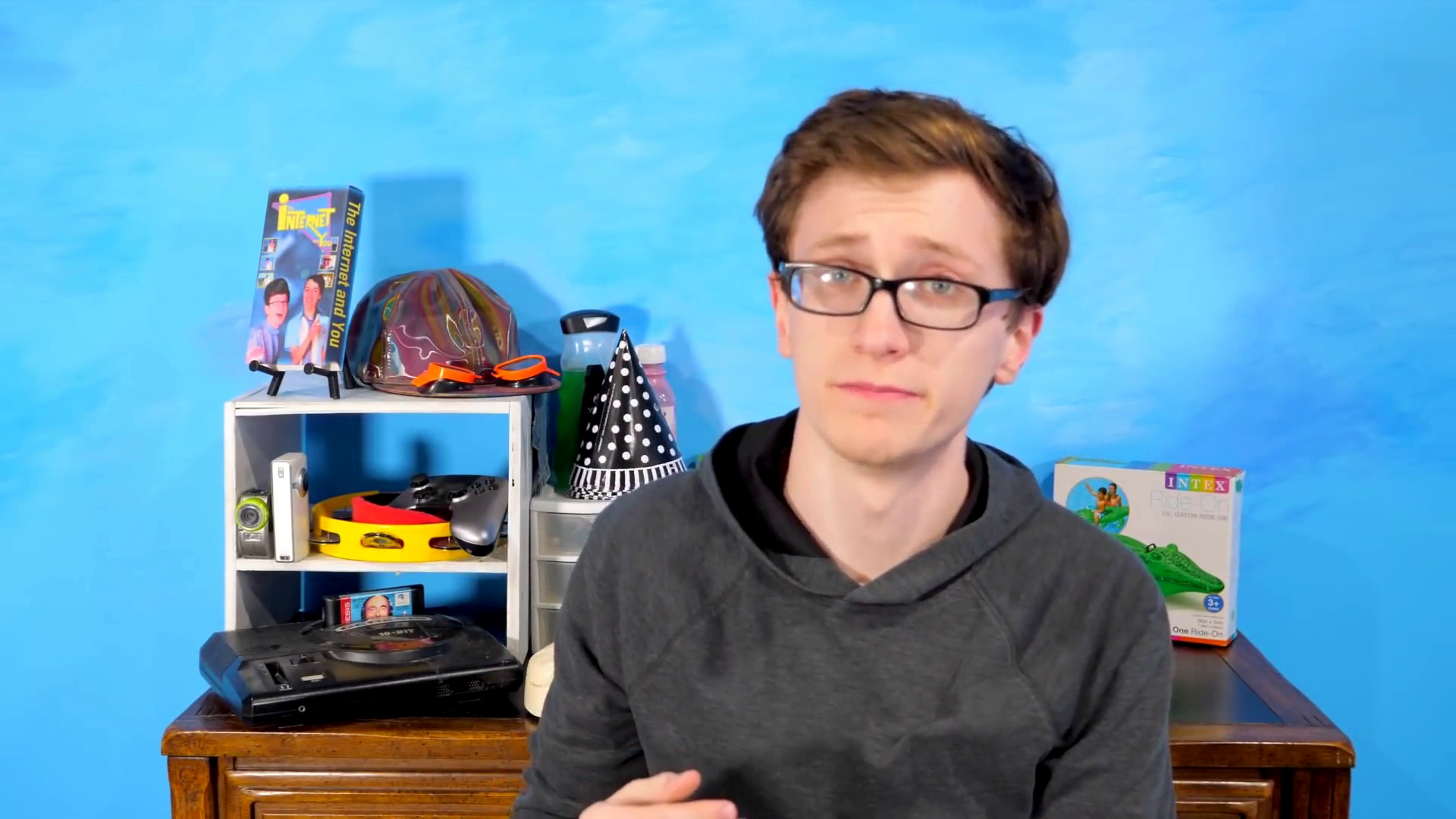
Wozniak on his set for a 2022 YouTube video

Scott The Woz has received positive reception from critics and writers. A 2020 listicle from Innovation & Tech Today's Anthony Elio named Scott the Woz as one of the five best YouTube channels for gamers, and Florian Thibodeau of Jeux.ca called Wozniak his favorite YouTuber.

The series has been praised for its humor and writing, described by Screen Rant's Pio Nepomuceno as "zany, off-kilter, and outlandish" in a ranking of the series' best episodes. Reviewing Scott the Woz for PC Games, Lukas Schmid hailed the series' comedic script as "perfect", writing that no cuts feel pointless and that running gags are established without overuse. Schmid, however, noted repetitive lines – commenting that statements are sometimes repeated word for word only three sentences later – but admitted that this might make the videos easier to follow. Kennedy Unthank from Plugged In called it a "fun" and "entertaining" show, but voiced a disliking towards aspects of the script that he found unsuitable for younger children. He criticized crude jokes, such as the referral of condoms as "a college essential", and disapproved of the use of swearing; whilst words such as fuck and shit are censored, he noticed that other words, such as dick and bitch are not.

The series' characters and universe have also received positive reception, having been called absurd or surreal. Schmid called the cast of Wozniak and his friends fast-paced and funny, and particularly praised Wozniak's fictional portrayal of himself as an exaggerated character that still remains authentic.

Unthank positively noted Wozniak's research and detail on covered topics, opining that even episodes surpassing an hour in length still maintain a genuine and fair review. Nepomuceno wrote that the best episodes of Scott the Woz are those that combine his reviews, retrospectives, and skits. Comparing the series' 2017 review of Super Mario 3D World to its 2021 re-review, Nepomuceno said that the 2021 review does well in incorporating jokes to the more "serious" 2017 analysis – which was similar to a "formal game review".

Automaton criticized Wozniak for a segment in the episode "Nintendo Switch: Five Years In", in which he criticized Super Monkey Ball Banana Mania's use of the Unity game engine. He had repeated a common prejudice that the Unity Engine, due to its cheaper features and engine limitations, had caused worse gameplay. However, game developers expressed frustration from this, saying the negative impression is detrimental to indie Unity developers. Scott apologized and said that this was a "dumb line" as an excuse for his discomfort with the game, and that he would do more research in the future.

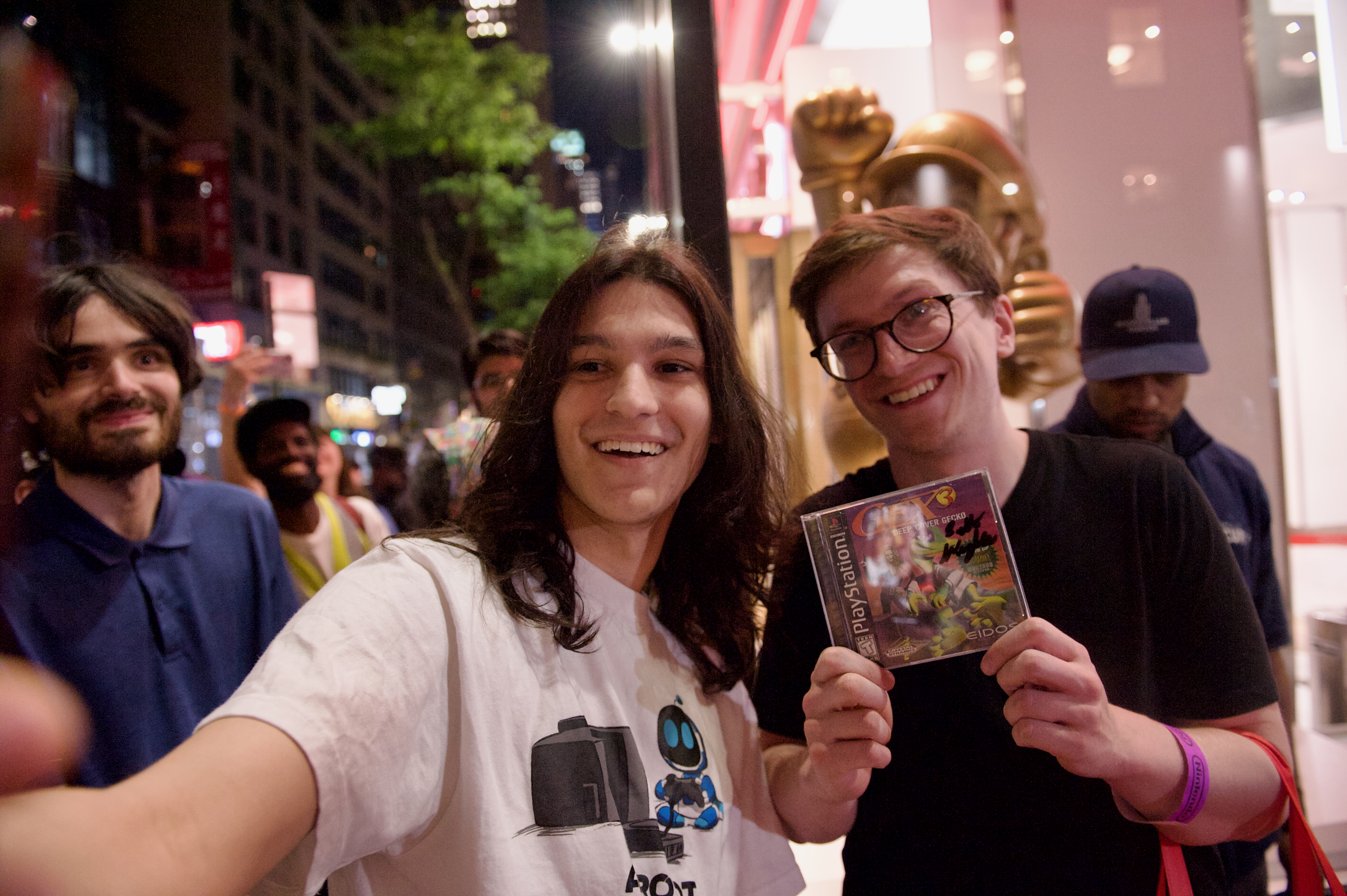
Scott Wozniak, at the Nintendo Switch 2 release in New York City, taking a selfie with a fan and a signed copy of Gex 3: Deep Cover Gecko.

His YouTube channel Scott The Woz has amassed over 2 million subscribers as of December 2025, and its popularity has been noted by writers. John Connor Coulston, writing for PopCulture.com, described the fanbase as a "huge online following", and attributed the series' popularity to its "comedic-yet-earnest" style produced in a unique homemade manner. Schmid described the show's style as "simple", though with much effort put into "tiny side gags", and praised the series' lack of sponsorships.

== Other media ==
Wozniak also hosts a second YouTube channel, Scott's Stash, where he covers gaming topics in a more casual conversation format. In 2021, Wozniak had a cameo in the film Hero Mode. In September 2024, Wozniak bought an old iPhone from eBay, which had the contact, name, and number of American actor Jason Momoa. Wozniak has also collaborated with American YouTuber James Rolfe on his YouTube channel CineMassacre, which hosts the Angry Video Game Nerd series.

== See also ==
- Angry Video Game Nerd, a similar comedy-based web series about gaming
- List of YouTubers
