= Avani Gregg =

American social media personality

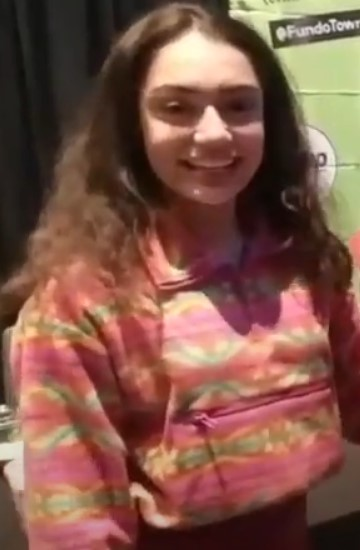
- Gregg in 2020
- Born: Avani Kiana Gregg; November 23, 2002 (age 23); Brownsburg, Indiana, U.S.
- Occupations: Social media personality; actress
- Years active: 2019–present
- Known for: TikTok
- Awards: Shorty Award (2019)

Instagram information
- Page: avani
- Followers: 15.8 million (May 12, 2025)

TikTok information
- Page: avani
- Followers: 42 million

Avani Kiana Gregg (born November 23, 2002) is an American social media personality and actress who first developed a following on TikTok. She plays Gemma in the web series Chicken Girls. She received the Shorty Award for TikToker of the Year in 2019, and was on the Forbes 30 Under 30 in 2020 in the social media category.

== Early life ==
Gregg was born in Brownsburg, Indiana, on November 23, 2002. She is of Indian, Mongolian, and African-American descent. She has two sisters, Shanti, a social media influencer, and Priya.

As a child, Gregg was a competitive gymnast until suffering a stress fracture in her back in July 2019.

Gregg graduated early from high school after taking summer classes.

== Career ==
Gregg posts content related to beauty and makeup. In 2019, Gregg's first viral video on TikTok of her transformation into a Harley Quinn-style clown led viewers to nickname her the "Clown Girl". In December 2019, she joined the Los Angeles-based collective The Hype House along with her best friend Charli D'Amelio.

In September 2020, she announced an upcoming memoir published by Gallery Books.

=== Web series ===
Gregg plays the character Gemma in the web series Chicken Girls.

In November 2020, she began hosting a Facebook Watch talk show Here For It in which she helped fans with Gen-Z issues.

== Personal life ==
Gregg moved to Los Angeles with her mother in early 2020.

In March 2020, Gregg confirmed she was in a relationship with social media personality Anthony Reeves. Gregg and Reeves met in 2018 through Instagram. Amid cheating rumors, Reeves stated the couple had broken up in a November 2022 tweet.

== Awards and nominations ==
Year	Award	Category	Result	Ref(s)
2019	Shorty Award	TikToker	Won	
2020	Forbes 30 Under 30	Social Media		
2021	Streamys	Lifestyle	Nominated	
2021	Streamys	Creator of the year	Nominated	

== See also ==
- List of most-followed TikTok accounts
