= Melanie Paxson =

American actress

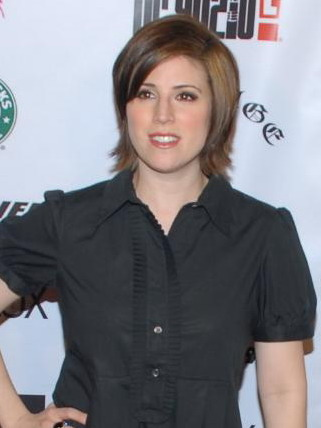
- Paxson in 2007
- Occupation: Actress
- Years active: 1997–present

Melanie Paxson is an American actress. She is known for her roles as Jaclyn in Cupid, Sara Brennan in Happy Family, and Julie in Notes from the Underbelly. She also played Fairy Godmother in the Descendants film series, being the only cast member present in all five installments. Paxson also appeared in a number of Gladware television commercials in the early 2000s.

== Life and career ==
Paxson became involved with "The Crew on the U" on Chicago's WCIU-TV. The Crew was made up of a group of young actors (including WCIU personality George Blaise) that appeared in promos for the station shortly after WCIU became a full-time general English language station after Univision (its former affiliate) bought WGBO-TV. Paxson also appeared as Velma in promos for WCIU's Scooby-Doo episodes the station aired on weekday mornings. She was still seen on WCIU and WFBT (The Chicago low power station that was first home to MeTV in 2003) in disclaimers for E/I Children's programming as late as the mid 2000s. Paxson by that time had become relatively famous on a national level.

She pursued a screen career. In 1997, she had an uncredited role in the series Early Edition. Her first notable screen role was a recurring role as Jaclyn in the ABC series Cupid from 1998 to 1999. She went on guest star in the series The Drew Carey Show, Quintuplets, Joey, Related, Kitchen Confidential, CSI: Crime Scene Investigation, Surviving Suburbia, Rules of Engagement, Medium and The Exes. From 2003 to 2004, Paxson had a regular role in the NBC sitcom Happy Family as Sara Brennan. From 2007 to 2008, she co-starred as Julie in the ABC sitcom Notes from the Underbelly, the series aired for two seasons. From 2009 to 2010, she had a recurring role as Doris Madigan (née Aidem) on the Nickelodeon sitcom True Jackson, VP. She is also the spokeswoman in Red Robin's burger commercials.

Paxson's film credits include Ready to Rumble (2000), Slackers (2002), Saving Mr. Banks as Dolly (Dolores Vought), Disney's secretary (2013), and starring as Joyce DeWitt in the television film Behind the Camera: The Unauthorized Story of Three's Company (2003). She has appeared in television commercials for Fiber One, Target, Yoplait, Red Robin, Glad Trash Bags, Hotels.com and Serta mattresses. From 2015 to 2019 she starred in the Disney Channel Original Movie franchise Descendants with its sequels, Descendants 2 and Descendants 3. She played the Fairy Godmother from Cinderella now serving as the Headmistress for the school, Auradon Prep. She also played a mother of a schoolchild in a second season episode of the ABC comedy Speechless, which played on October 4, 2017.

== Filmography ==
=== Film ===
Year	Title	Role	Notes
1999	The Opera Lover	Bibi	
2000	Ready to Rumble	Wendy	
2013	Ending Up	Blair	Short film
2013	Saving Mr. Banks	Dolly	
2015	Come Simi	Lucy	
2015	The Outfield	Judith Meola	
2017	The Magnificent Room	Stacy	
2018	Chicken Girls: The Movie	Principal Anthony	
2024	Descendants: The Rise of Red	Fairy Godmother	
2026	Descendants: Wicked Wonderland	Fairy Godmother	

=== Television ===
Year	Title	Role	Notes
1997	Early Edition	Candace	Episode: "A Regular Joe"
1998–1999	Cupid	Jaclyn	Recurring role
2001	Kristin	Madeline	Episode: "The Escort"
2002	Dexter Prep	Meg	Television film
2003	Behind the Camera: The Unauthorized Story of Three's Company	Joyce DeWitt	Television film
2003	The Drew Carey Show	Teri	Episode: "Two Girls for Every Boy"
2003–2004	Happy Family	Sara Brennan	Main role
2004	Quintuplets	Lisa	Episode: "Quint Con"
2005	Related	Kathy	Episode: "Cry Me a Sister"
2005	Kitchen Confidential	Jessica	Episode: "You Lose, I Win"
2005–2006	Joey	Marci	2 episodes
2007	CSI: Crime Scene Investigation	Nancy Katz	Episode: "A La Cart"
2007–2008	Notes from the Underbelly	Julie	Main role
2009	Surviving Suburbia	Carla	Episode: "Project Run Away"
2009	Rules of Engagement	Deirdre	Episode: "Twice"
2009	Medium	Miss Colletto	Episode: "Bite Me"
2009–2010	True Jackson, VP	Doris Aden	Recurring role
2011	The Exes	Rebecca	Episode: "Lutz and the Real Girl"
2012	Last Man Standing	Liz	Episode: "The Spotlight"
2013–2014	American Dad!	Harper (voice)	3 episodes
2014	Masters of Sex	Mrs. Turnsworth	Episode: "Giants"
2015	Cougar Town	Mary	2 episodes
2015	Descendants	Fairy Godmother	Television film
2015	Truth Be Told	Linda	3 episodes
2016	The Real O'Neals	Nancy	2 episodes
2016	Trollhunters	Gladys (voice)	2 episodes
2017	Bones	Patty	Episode: "The Brain in the Bot"
2017	Trial & Error	Gail	Episode: "A Hostile Jury"
2017	Descendants 2	Fairy Godmother	Television film
2017	Speechless	Carla	Episode: "F-I-- FIRST S-E-- SECOND F-- FIRST DAY"
2019	Descendants 3	Fairy Godmother	Television film
