= Hero Mode =

- Directed by: A.J. Tesler
- Written by: Jeff Carpenter
- Produced by: A.J. Tesler, Marcy Carpenter, E.J. Kavounas
- Starring: Chris Carpenter; Mira Sorvino; Sean Astin
- Music by: Bill Brown
- Distributed by: Blue Fox Entertainment
- Release date: June 4, 2021
- Running time: 88 minutes

Hero Mode, also known as Mayfield's Game in Australia and the United Kingdom, is a 2021 American independent comedy film directed by A.J. Tesler (in his directorial debut) and written by Jeff Carpenter. Produced by Marcy Carpenter, E.J. Kavounas, and Tesler, the film was released in American theaters on June 4, 2021, distributed by Blue Fox Entertainment, followed by video on demand on June 11, 2021. It received mixed reviews from critics.

== Plot ==
Financially struggling indie video game business owner Kate asks her son Troy (Chris Carpenter) to develop a video game in time for an upcoming gaming convention in order to save the company. Troy is enthusiastic for the job. But the company's disgruntled coders are not, while Rick, the CEO of a rival company, looks to buy out the studio in order to gut it and fire everyone.

== Cast ==
=== Main ===
- Chris Carpenter as Troy Mayfield
- Mira Sorvino as Kate Mayfield
- Sean Astin as Jimmy Tisdale
- Indiana Massara as Paige
- Philip Solomon as Nick
- Nelson Franklin as Rick
- Mary Lynn Rajskub as Larua
- Kimia Behpoornia as Marie
- Bobby Lee as VP Goodson
- Creed Bratton as James
- Jim O'Heir as James
- Monte Markham as Lyndon
- Bret Harrison as George
- Al Madrigal as Larry
- Erik Griffin as Mr. Diehl

=== Cameo ===
- Sonja Read (OMGitsfirefoxx) as Announcer
- Wood Hawker (BeatEmUps) as himself
- Matthew Patrick (MatPat) as himself
- Scott Wozniak (Scott the Woz) as himself

== Production ==
While in production the film went under the title of Mayfield's Game. Filming took place in Los Angeles.

== Release ==
Before its release the film generated criticism for its perceived unrealistic portrayal of video game development. The film was released in American theaters on June 4, 2021, distributed by Blue Fox Entertainment. It was followed by video on demand releases on June 11, 2021. It opened with $11,843, for a total domestic gross of $21,178.

== Critical reception ==
Writing in Variety, critic Nick Schager described the film as a "lively saga about a young coding wizard who’s charged with saving his family’s gaming business [that] doesn’t break novel ground in any respect," but that "its good humor, spry pacing and likable performances should appeal to its pre-high-school target audience." Critic Richard Whittaker wrote in The Austin Chronicle that the film is "a sweet, vaguely moralizing, teen-and-tween-friendly light drama," and that it "is charming if undemanding, and feels at least a little authentic to its milieu." Film critic Roger Moore wrote that the film "isn’t interesting enough to stand on its own, despite manic efforts by Astin and an amusing line here and there."

On review aggregator Rotten Tomatoes, the film holds an approval rating of 46% based on reviews from 13 critics. Metacritic gave the film a weighted average score of 46 out of 100 based on 5 critics, indicating "mixed or average" reviews.
