= Happy Family (American TV series) =

American sitcom television series (2003–2004)

- Genre: Sitcom
- Created by: Moses Port; David Guarascio
- Directed by: Pamela Fryman
- Starring: Christine Baranski; John Larroquette; Jeff B. Davis; Melanie Paxson; Tyler Francavilla; Susan Gibney
- Composer: Adam Gorgoni
- Country of origin: United States
- Original language: English
- No. of seasons: 1
- No. of episodes: 22

Production
- Executive producers: Moses Port; David Guarascio; Pamela Fryman
- Camera setup: Multi-camera
- Running time: 30 minutes
- Production companies: Guarascio/Port Productions; NBC Studios

Original release
- Network: NBC
- Release: September 9, 2003 – April 20, 2004

Happy Family is an American sitcom television series created by Moses Port and David Guarascio, that aired on NBC from September 9, 2003, until April 20, 2004.

== Premise ==
John Larroquette and Christine Baranski star as Peter and Annie Brennan, soon-to-be empty nesters who couldn't be happier about it. However, their joy is short-lived when their youngest son, Tim (Tyler Francavilla) flunks out of community college, forcing Peter and Annie to continue their parental duties. Their eldest son, Todd (Jeff B. Davis) decides to dump his fiancée only days before the wedding. Their daughter Sara (Melanie Paxson), despite having a successful career, struggles to find or keep a romantic partner and instead spends her time socializing with her parrot. If that isn't enough, after Tim drops out of college, he moves in with Maggie, a divorced middle-aged family friend and neighbor, and announces that they are dating. Peter and Annie are constantly trying to find time without the kids and their problems, but while attempting to maintain a happy family image, they end up more involved with their children more than ever.

== Cast ==
- John Larroquette as Peter Brennan
- Christine Baranski as Annie Brennan, Peter's wife
- Jeff B. Davis as Todd Brennan, Peter & Annie's first son
- Melanie Paxson as Sara Brennan, Peter & Annie's daughter
- Tyler Francavilla as Tim Brennan, Peter & Annie's second son
- Susan Gibney as Maggie Harris, Todd's fiancée

== Episodes ==
Every episode of the series was directed by Pamela Fryman.

No.	Title	Written by	Original release date	U.S. viewers (millions)
1	"Pilot"	Moses Port & David Guarascio	September 9, 2003	14.67
2	"Over and Out"	Moses Port & David Guarascio	September 16, 2003	9.97
3	"Tooth"	Moses Port & David Guarascio	September 23, 2003	9.24
4	"Dinner with Friends"	David Walpert	September 30, 2003	8.81
5	"Tim's Blank"	Joe Port & Joe Wiseman	October 7, 2003	8.61
6	"Sara Rebels"	Jennifer Celotta	October 14, 2003	9.24
7	"The Doghouse"	Lester Lewis	October 21, 2003	9.21
8	"1:42"	David Walpert	October 28, 2003	9.17
9	"Not Thanksgiving"	Danielle Sanchez-Witzel	November 11, 2003	7.23
10	"Randall's Gift"	Moses Port & David Guarascio	November 18, 2003	8.34
11	"Bill's Back"	Jennifer Celotta	December 2, 2003	8.85
12	"Mother and Child Reunion"	Stacy Traub	December 9, 2003	10.38
13	"Wedding Plans"	Moses Port & David Guarascio	January 6, 2004	10.18
14	"Rules and Girls"	Stacy Traub	January 13, 2004	9.09
15	"The One with the Friends"	Dave Finkel & Brett Baer	February 3, 2004	6.45
16	"Bye Bye Birdie"	Joe Port & Joe Wiseman	February 24, 2004	5.78
17	"The Headboard"	Jennifer Celotta	March 2, 2004	5.39
18	"Secrets"	Danielle Sanchez-Witzel	March 16, 2004	5.67
19	"The Juicer"	David Finkel & Brett Baer	March 23, 2004	4.73
20	"The Play"	David Finkel & Brett Baer	March 30, 2004	5.56
21	"The Shampoo Effect"	Stacy Traub	April 6, 2004	5.32
22	"Dear Mom"	Joe Wiseman & Joe Port	April 20, 2004	4.94
