= Chicken Girls: The Movie =

2018 film

- Directed by: Asher Levin
- Written by: Janey Feingold
- Based on: Chicken Girls by Janey Feingold
- Starring: Annie LeBlanc; Hayden Summerall; Brooke Butler; Aliyah Moulden; Carson Lueders; Indiana Massara; Rush Holland; Adrian R’Mante; Melanie Paxson
- Cinematography: John Esparza
- Edited by: Grace Zahrah
- Distributed by: Brat
- Release date: June 29, 2018
- Running time: 70 minutes
- Country: United States
- Language: English
- Budget: $500,000

Chicken Girls: The Movie is a 2018 film based on the Brat show Chicken Girls. The film was directed by Asher Levin and written by Janey Feingold, and stars Annie LeBlanc, Hayden Summerall, Brooke Butler, Carson Lueders, Indiana Massara, Aliyah Moulden, Rush Holland, Adrian R'Mante, and Melanie Paxson. The movie premiered on June 29, 2018.

== Plot ==
The film kicks off with Rhyme and TK on a date in Paris, actually a movie scene directed by TK and Flash. Later, Rhyme, Ellie, Kayla, and Quinn discuss Spring Fling and dance date plans. Rhyme wishes to go with TK. The school sings "Dancing on the Ceiling," interrupted by Principal Anthony, who bans hallway singing, puzzling Ellie.

The Chicken Girls chat about Principal Anthony, and Luna predicts Power Surge will shine at tryouts. Senõr Singer notes the focus on the dance over academics. TK, Flash, and Ace discuss reshooting their movie. Ace questions why it's not done, leading to a squabble with Flash about priorities. TK suggests their bickering is why they lack dance invites. Ace and Flash reassure TK, reminding him he hasn't been asked to the dance.

Ellie, at the library, sings and is interrupted by Davis, who compliments her. Thinking he wants a Spring Fling date, Ellie shuts him down, but he clarifies he doesn't want to go to the dance. Davis helps her with polynomials. Flash praises TK's movie to Rhyme, inquiring about Spring Fling plans, but TK hasn't been asked. In another part of the library, Kayla discusses potential dance partners with Flash and tells him to text her. Quinn and Rooney argue, noted by Birdie, who remarks they fight like biological siblings.

Senõr Singer holds auditions, and Ace's performance is stopped for getting too close. Attaway Dance Team and Power Surge have a dance battle. Sheldon questions TK and Flash filming, prompting them to follow him. Senõr Singer declares both teams will perform together, frustrating Birdie and Luna.

Rhyme shares her troubles with Harmony, who discovers Principal Anthony has a crush on Senõr Singer. Harmony plans to save the spring fling, enlisting Rooney, Ace, and Luna. The plan unfolds: Rhyme gives Principal Anthony cashmere, Ace asks Senõr Singer about her, and Luna falsely informs Sheldon Rhyme is skipping class. Principal Anthony and Sheldon visit the elderly home, and Rhyme and Rooney talk to an elderly couple. Luna, disguised as an old lady, expresses a wish for one last dance. Principal Anthony reinstates the dance, but they must pass the Test Test. Rhyme misses a study date with TK.

Birdie and Tim study, while Kayla texts Flash, advised by Ace not to respond. Rooney invites Quinn to study with her and Hamilton, but is declined. Ellie and Davis collaborate on their studies. Kayla regrets considering asking Flash and tells him it was a mistake. Hamilton suggests Rooney ask him to the dance, but she insists on asking someone else first. Rhyme apologizes to TK for missing their study date.

After the Test Test, Rhyme finds out she failed, blaming Harmony's distracting scheme. Rhyme sings as everyone prepares for the dance. Rooney and Quinn learn their parents aren't divorcing. Ellie, Kayla, and Quinn visit Rhyme's house, where they sing "Birds of a Feather." Rhyme apologizes, and they plan a way for her to attend the dance.

The dance kicks off with Ellie and Davis, Birdie and Tim, and Rooney inviting Hamilton to dance. Flash admits to Kayla about the texts, and they join the dance. Luna asks Ace for a friendly dance. TK dances with Dru but leaves upon not finding Rhyme. Attaway and Power Surge reconcile, and Rhyme shows up in a chicken suit. She strikes a deal with Principal Anthony to study extra hard if allowed to dance, and the two teams perform together. Rhyme returns home, apologizes to Harmony, and TK shows her a film he made about them. He reveals plans to spend the summer with Flash. As Rhyme leaves, TK stops her, and they share a kiss.

== Cast ==
- Annie LeBlanc as Rhyme McAdams, a Chicken girl and Harmony's older sister
- Hayden Summerall as Tommy "T. K." Kaye, Rhyme's childhood friend and love interest Birdie's younger brother
- Brooke Butler as Ellie Mack, Rhyme's best friend and is a Chicken Girl
- Carson Lueders as Ace, T. K.'s best friend
- Indiana Massara as Rooney Forrester
- Aliyah Moulden as Luna
- Grayson Thorne Kilpatrick as Sheldon
- Adrian R'Mante as Señor Singer
- Melanie Paxson as Principal Anthony
- Rush Holland as Flash, T. K. and Ace's best friend
- Hayley LeBlanc as Harmony McAdams, Rhyme's younger sister
- Dylan Conrique as Kayla Seltzer, Rhyme and Ellie and Quinn's best friend and Tim's cousin
- Riley Lewis as Quinn Forrester, Rhyme's best friend and a Chicken girl and Rooney's step sister
- Madison Lewis as Birdie Kaye, T. K. 's older sister
- Caden Conrique as Tim Sharp
- Jeremiah Perkins as Hamilton
- Jenna Davis as Monica Allen
- Billy LeBlanc as Mr. Forrester
- Rebecca Zamolo as Mrs. Forrester
- Kelsey Lynn Cook as Kimmie
- Erin Reese DeJarnette as Bess
- Talin Silva as Jade
- Jaden Martin as Davis

== Production ==
Filming took place in December 2017. The premiere took place on June 28, 2018, at Ahrya Fine Arts Theatre in Beverly Hills, California. The film was released online through the Brat channel on June 29, 2018.

== Music ==
"Dancing on the Ceiling", performed by Jules LeBlanc and the cast of Chicken Girls, was released as single on May 29, 2018, along with its music video. The song served as the opening number for the film. During the scene with Rhyme, Rooney, Ace, and Luna carrying out Operation Tango, the song "Feels Good" by Carson Lueders was used. After the Test Test, Rhyme sang a cover of "Stay" by Lisa Loeb. "Party Favor" by Cali Rodi was also used as the song for the final dance number in the movie. At the end of the movie, when TK and Rhyme kissed, as well as in the movie's outro, the song "Smiles For You" by Hayden Summerall was used. Carson Lueders also performed a song in this movie that was never released outside of the movie.

== Reception ==
It received 2 million viewers in its first day and hit 10 million views on July 17, 2018. The film did not get much attention from Hollywood upon release. It received a mixed to negative review from Decider who praised Butler's performance saying "Butler really sells the character" but criticised the "hammy dialogue" and "poor-quality musical aspects". It hit 25 million views on January 28, 2020. The movie is the most popular program to ever be released on Brat, as it stands at 40 million views (as of February 2024).
