= Zach Justice =

American actor and comedian (born 1995)

- Born: Zachary Christian Justice; September 4, 1995 (age 31); Las Vegas, Nevada, U.S.
- Education: Brantley County High School; LaGrange College
- Occupations: Online personality; influencer; actor; writer
- Years active: 2015–present

TikTok information
- Page: Zach Justice
- Followers: 5.7 million

YouTube information
- Channel: Zach Justice
- Genres: vlog; comedy
- Views: 933 million
- Last updated: December 18, 2025

Zachary Christian Justice (born September 4, 1995) is an American actor, comedian, writer, and media personality. He is known for co-founding Dropouts University Studios, an indie media production company focused heavily on podcasting and sketch comedy.

== Early life and education ==
Zachary Christian Justice was born in Las Vegas, Nevada to Joseph Justice, a United States Air Force colonel, and Gina Thornton, a school guidance counselor. His father left when he was young and he was raised by his mother in South Georgia, primarily Brunswick.

He attended St. Mary on the Hill Catholic School in Augusta and later Brantley County High School, where he played tennis. He was a region champion three times and was an honor student, becoming a member of the National Junior Honor Society. He attended LaGrange College, where he played tennis for a year before leaving to pursue his career. He worked at an Outback Steakhouse in the Atlanta area for a short time after leaving college.

== Career ==
Justice began his acting career in 2015 when he appeared in the film Dead of Night as Donnie Harris.

In June 2020, he co-founded Dropouts University Studios, a media production company, alongside Indiana Massara and Jared Bailey. The company focuses on creator-driven content, particularly podcasts and sketch comedy. The Dropouts podcast, produced by the studio, have hosted LaurDIY, Tana Mongeau, Manny MUA, Laura Lee, Sam and Colby, amongst many others. He is managed by Fixated, which is partnered with Eldridge Industries.

In 2024, he sold his script Breaking Up With Mom and Dad to Convergence Entertainment, which is set to be directed by Steve Carr and produced by Justice. In November 2024, he began posting his popular Dating Show series on his personal YouTube channel which features himself, occasionally joined by guests, participating in various blind dates and similar challenges.

In 2025, he participated as a contestant in the first season of InSIDE: USA, making it to the final, before deciding he wanted to give the Prizepool to the other finalist, Aisha Mian. He set to appear in The Re-Start television series as Mason, and is also a writer for the show.

== Personal life ==
From 2020 to 2023, he was in a relationship with Australian model, Indiana Massara.

When asked about his views on religion and the afterlife, he responded with "I genuinely don't know... I'm comfortable saying I genuinely don't know."

Justice avoids discussing politics. When hosting an episode of The Lunch Table podcast, Justice maintained his neutrality, responding to a co-host discussing politics that he thinks people in both major parties are decent and that "both sides have good ideas, both sides have bad ideas."

Justice enjoys sports and played tennis in high school and college. In 2022, he tore his ACL while playing basketball.

== Filmography ==
Key
†	Denotes films that have not yet been released

=== Film ===
Year	Title	Role	Notes
2015	Dead of Night	Donnie Harris	
TBA	Breaking Up with Mom and Dad †	—N/a	Writer and producer

=== Television ===
Year	Title	Role	Notes
2021	Burb Patrol	Derek/Derrick,	6 episodes
2022	Best Foot Forward	Joel	Episode: "Movie Night"
2025	Inside USA	Contestant	Season 1
TBA	The Re-Start †	Mason	Also writer
