= Rob Fishman =

American entrepreneur and writer

- Born: March 31, 1986 (age 40); Scarsdale, New York, U.S.
- Education: Cornell University; Columbia University Graduate School of Journalism
- Occupations: Entrepreneur; writer

Rob Fishman (born March 31, 1986) is an American entrepreneur and writer.

== Early life and education ==
Fishman was born on March 31, 1986, in Scarsdale, New York. He is the great-nephew of 60 Minutes creator Don Hewitt and Marilyn Berger.

He graduated from Cornell University and Columbia University Graduate School of Journalism.

== Career ==
In 2013, Fishman's first company was sold to BuzzFeed, BuzzFeed's first acquisition. Subsequently, in 2013, Fishman co-founded Niche, a marketing company that was acquired by Twitter in 2015 for $50 million. In its first year of operations, Niche earned $1 million in revenue. As part of Twitter, Niche has become a "significant revenue driver" for the social network. In November 2016, Fortune reported that Fishman had confirmed his departure from Twitter.

Fishman worked as social media editor for The Huffington Post, contributing editor for BuzzFeed, and has written for Slate, New York, and The Daily Beast. Fishman's coverage of the Cornell gorge suicides in 2010 for The Huffington Post gained widespread attention. In 2013, a story he wrote for BuzzFeed, claiming that "the social media editor is dead," led to a firestorm from new media journalists.

In 2015, Fishman was named to the Forbes "30 Under 30" list. In 2016, he produced Alexander IRL, a teen comedy film starring Nathan Kress that was acquired by YouTube Red.

In 2017, Fishman founded Brat TV, a video production startup in Los Angeles.
