= Joel Adams (singer) =

Australian singer-songwriter (born 1996)

- Born: Joel Gonçalves; 16 December 1996 (age 29); Brisbane, Australia
- Genres: Pop; soul; indie pop
- Occupations: Singer; songwriter; producer
- Instruments: Vocals; piano; acoustic; guitar
- Years active: 2012–present
- Website: joeladamsofficial.com

Joel Adams (born 16 December 1996) is an Australian pop/soul singer-songwriter and producer, popularly known for "Please Don't Go", his hit debut single from 2015. On 5 October 2018, Adams' single "Fake Friends" was released. He released his self-titled debut extended play in March 2020.

== Biography ==
Adams was born and raised in Brisbane, Australia. He is of Portuguese, South African and English descent. Joel is a graduate of Marist College Ashgrove in Brisbane.

His stage name is his mother's maiden name. Joel changed his name from Gonçalves due to his last name being difficult to spell and correctly pronounce due to his Portuguese heritage.

== Career ==
=== 2012–present: The X Factor and "Please Don't Go" ===
Joel gained popularity in 2012, at the age of 15, singing a cover of Michael Jackson and Paul McCartney's "The Girl Is Mine" for the X Factor Australia (under the name Joel Gonçalves). After being featured as one of the youngest and most promising singers, he was eliminated during the "bootcamp" round.

He released his debut single "Please Don't Go" in November 2015, which made its ARIA Chart debut in February 2016 at number 88, later peaking at number 55. It also peaked at number 54 on the Canadian Hot 100, number 6 in Sweden and number 11 in Norway. The song also appeared on the UK Independent Single Breakers Charts for 42 weeks, peaking at number 1 for multiple weeks in June, July, August, and September 2016. and peaking at number 50 on the UK Singles Chart the week of 5 August 2016. The song officially charted in over 15 countries globally, including the USA, UK, Canada, and Australia. In Australia, the song spent 31 weeks in the ARIA Top 100 Singles Chart – but never once cracked the Top 50; peaking at No. 55.

In October 2016, Adams was named the 16th most influential artist in the world on Spotify's 25 Under 25 list, which listed the most influential music artists under the age of 25.

In January 2017, Adams released the video for "Die for You". It was available for free download from his website.

In October 2018, Adams released his second single, "Fake Friends". The song was co-written by Adams, Ryan Tedder and Zach Skelton. According to Adams' team, the song is "about discovering who your real friends are when the chips are down".

In 2024, Adams formed the group Simply West.

== Discography ==
=== Extended plays ===
List of extended plays, with selected details
Title	Extended play details
Joel Adams	Released: 6 March 2020; Label: Joel Adams; Formats: streaming, Digital download

=== Charted and certified singles ===
Title	Year	Peak chart positions									Certifications	Album
Title	Year	AUS	CAN	CZR	DEN	IRE	ITA	NOR	SWE	UK	Certifications	Album
"Please Don't Go"	2015	55	54	25	29	34	56	11	6	50	BPI: Gold; FIMI: Platinum; IFPI DEN: Platinum	Non-album single
