= Jules LeBlanc =

American YouTuber, actress and singer (born 2004)

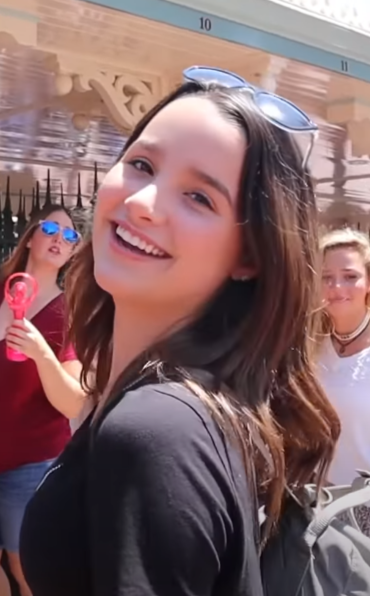
- LeBlanc in 2019
- Born: Julianna Grace LeBlanc; December 5, 2004 (age 21); Augusta, Georgia, U.S.
- Other name: Annie LeBlanc
- Occupations: YouTuber; actress; singer; artistic gymnast

YouTube information
- Channel: Jules LeBlanc
- Years active: 2008–present
- Genre: Vlog
- Subscribers: 4.23 million
- Views: 400 million
- Musical career
- Genres: Electronic; country
- Years active: 2017–present
- Last updated: March 29, 2025

Julianna Grace LeBlanc (/ləˈblɒŋk/; born December 5, 2004), known professionally as both Annie LeBlanc and Jules LeBlanc, is an American YouTuber, actress, singer, and former gymnast. In December 2018, Business Insider called her one of the "most famous teens in the world." She appeared on the YouTube channel Bratayley from the age of six and has since gained an extensive online following of her own.

LeBlanc was on the YouTube Red series We Are Savvy before going on to work with the Brat network, starring as Rhyme McAdams in Chicken Girls and its spinoff films and the titular character of A Girl Named Jo. On television, she starred as Lex in the Nickelodeon series Side Hustle. She is currently active on her own YouTube channel posting vlogs.

== Early life ==
Julianna Grace LeBlanc was born on December 5, 2004, in Augusta, Georgia, to Katelyn and Billy LeBlanc, she grew up in Severna Park, Maryland.

She has two siblings: a younger sister Hayley, who is also an actress, and an older brother Caleb, who died in 2015 from hypertrophic cardiomyopathy, at the age of 13. LeBlanc started taking gymnastics classes when she was two years old, and her family started posting videos of her online when she was three. She trained as a gymnast until August 2017. The LeBlancs previously lived in Severna Park, Maryland, but moved to Los Angeles, California for Jules and Hayley to better pursue acting and music careers.

== Career ==
LeBlanc was originally known for her gymnastic videos. Her gymnastic meets and tutorials started being published in 2008 on her YouTube channel, formerly known as Acroanna, when she was 3 years old. The channel's name was changed in 2017, and now features music videos of Jules LeBlanc.

LeBlanc is one of the stars of a daily vlog on the YouTube channel "Bratayley" (7.3M+ subscribers). The vlog, which was initially just for relatives and started being filmed when LeBlanc was six, follows the lives of the LeBlanc family; no further videos have been posted since November 2019. The stars include parents Billy and Katie with their two daughters Jules and Hayley and son Caleb. The name "Bratayley" was initially a nickname for Hayley, combining the word "brat" and the name "Hayley."

LeBlanc had begun to receive attention for her content on her TikTok handle @julesleblanc. In April 2018, she won the Shorty Award for "Muser of the Year".

LeBlanc and Hayden Summerall collaborated on a YouTube cover of "Little Do You Know" by Alex & Sierra, which went viral. LeBlanc appeared at position 48 on the Emerging Artists Billboard Chart. LeBlanc and Summerall were cast as leads in Chicken Girls despite having no acting experience prior to starring in the series. In August 2017, Brat released the series on YouTube. The series features LeBlanc and Summerall's relationship, and focuses on the daily lives of a group of friends and dancers at the faux high school, "Attaway High". The show's debut episode has received over 10 million YouTube views, and as of May 2018, the second season had between 2 million and 4.5 million views per episode.

On September 9, 2017, LeBlanc's cover of the song "Fly" by Maddie & Tae peaked at 34 on the Billboard Charts in "Country" songs. In November 2017, LeBlanc released her debut original single, "Ordinary Girl." In December 2017, teen fan magazine Tiger Beat announced that LeBlanc would be going on her first U.S. tour in early 2018. In February 2018, LeBlanc released a single, "Little Things." In early May 2018, LeBlanc released a new pop country compilation album on iTunes called, "Lollipop", with music label Heard Well. The curated collection also includes two songs by LeBlanc, "Somebody's Heart" and "Photograph." She then released the song "Picture This" in early June with social media star Austin Brown In November 2018, she released her single "It’s Gonna Snow" as a new Christmas Carol.

In August 2017, YouTube greenlit the YouTube Red Originals series, We Are Savvy, as a continuation of a teen magazine series of the same name on Canada's Family Channel. LeBlanc was introduced as a co-host of the series, which debuted with over 4.2M+ views in its pilot episode and focuses on music, fashion, and lifestyle elements.

In February 2018, Variety announced that Lionsgate would be distributing a full-length feature film of Chicken Girls: The Movie. There is also a deal with Skyhorse Publishing to turn the show into a book series. In September 2018, the third season of Chicken Girls premiered on Brat's YouTube channel. Season 4 premiered on March 19, 2019.

In May 2018, LeBlanc and her sister Hayley LeBlanc were cast in a new series on the Brat YouTube channel. That same month, it was announced that LeBlanc and Addison Riecke would star in a Brat teen mystery series called A Girl Named Jo which takes place in 1963 in a small town. Also in May 2018, Leblanc appeared in Asher Angel's music video for "Chemistry" as the fans dubbed them as "Ashannie".

In December 2018 she starred in Brat's feature film, Holiday Spectacular. In March 2019, she also starred in another Brat feature film, Spring Breakaway.

In November 2019, Bratayley stopped making family vlogs after 9 years, due to the parents' divorce, and for them to focus on other projects.

In February 2020, LeBlanc was cast in a lead role for the Nickelodeon buddy comedy series Side Hustle alongside Jayden Bartels. In response to the COVID-19 pandemic in the United States, Nickelodeon offered LeBlanc and Bartels a virtually-produced talk show titled Group Chat, which premiered on May 23, 2020. Side Hustle ran from November 2020 to June 2022.

In July 2021, LeBlanc became the face of Pacsun's Fall 2021 collection, a campaign focused on reconnecting with yourself, old friends and nature.

On March 11, 2025, she co-starred alongside her sister Hayley in the Cineverse film, Uncontained!

== Discography ==
=== Compilation albums ===
- Lollipop (2018)

=== Singles ===
Year	Title	Peak chart positions		
Year	Title	US Country	CA Digital	US Digital
2017	"Fly"	34	—	—
2017	"Little Do You Know" (with Hayden Summerall)	—	38	30
2017	"Birds of a Feather"	—	—	—
2017	"Photograph"	—	—	—
2017	"Ordinary Girl"	—	—	—
2018	"Somebody's Heart"			
2018	"Your Hands"			
2018	"Dont Keep Me Guessing"			
2018	"Little Things"	—	—	—
2018	"Love at First Sight"			
2018	"Stay"			
2018	"Picture This"			
2019	"Over Getting Over You"	—	—	—
2019	"Two Sides"	—	—	—
2019	"Play Nice"	—	—	—
2019	"Over It" (with Indiana Massara & Aliyah Moulden)			
2019	"Who You Are" (feat. Sky Katz)	—	—	—
2019	"Utopia"	—	—	—

== Filmography ==
=== Television and film ===
Year	Title	Role	Notes
2018	Bizaardvark	Herself (as Annie LeBlanc)	Episode: "Spring Break Video Spectacular"
2019	Cousins for Life	Herself	Episode: "Those Medal-ling Kids"
2020–2022	Side Hustle	Lex	Main role
2020	#KidsTogether: The Nickelodeon Town Hall	Herself	Television special
2020	Group Chat	Herself	Host
2020	All That	Guest Star	Episode 1131
2025	Uncontained	Gabriel's Friend	Cineverse Film

=== Web ===
Year	Title	Role	Notes
2015	Neon Arcade	Annie Bratayley	Web game show
2016	We Are Savvy	Annie	Main role
2017–2022	Chicken Girls	Rhyme McAdams	Main role (Season 1–6) Guest role (Season 7–9)
2018	Mani	Rhyme McAdams	Episode: "Cinderella"
2018	Overnights	Rhyme McAdams	Episode: "Never Meant to Fall in Love"
2018	A Girl Named Jo	Josephine "Jo" Chambers	Lead role
2018	Chicken Girls: The Movie	Rhyme McAdams	Streaming film
2018	Brat Holiday Spectacular	Rhyme McAdams	Streaming film
2019	Spring Breakaway	Rhyme McAdams	Streaming film
2019	Annie VS Hayley !	Herself	Food reality web series
2019	Intern-in-Chief	Rhyme McAdams	Streaming film
2019	Sunnyside Up	Herself	Narrator

== Tours ==
- The Left Me Hangin' Tour (2017)

== Awards and nominations ==
Year	Award	Category	Result	Ref(s)
2017	Streamy Awards	Kids and Family	Nominated	
2018	Shorty Awards	Muser of the Year	Won	
2018	Streamy Awards	Acting in a Drama	Nominated	
2019	Teen Choice Awards	Choice Music Web Star	Won	
2020	Kids Choice Awards	Favorite Female Social Web Star	Won	
