= Brat TV =

American production company

Brat Inc.
- Type: Private
- Industry: Entertainment
- Founded: January 6, 2017; 9 years ago
- Founder: Rob Fishman; Darren Lachtman
- Headquarters: Los Angeles, California, United States
- Number of employees: 45 (2022)
- Subsidiaries: Crypt TV; ZATV
- Website: brat.tv

Brat Inc. is an American production company that posts web series on YouTube. Founded in 2017, the network features original shows and is geared toward Generation Z audiences.

Brat TV's flagship web series, Chicken Girls, spawned a subsequent film entitled Chicken Girls: The Movie. Brat has also produced shows featuring teenage stars from Disney Channel and Nickelodeon, such as Jules LeBlanc, Anna Cathcart, Francesca Capaldi, and Emily Skinner.

== History ==
Brat Inc. was founded on January 6, 2017 by television writer Rob Fishman and Darren Lachtman as an online network featuring scripted content, streaming for free on YouTube. The company originally received $2.5 million in seed funding. Fishman saw a gap in the online market for high-quality teenage shows available for free on digital platforms. Fishman noted how the social media celebrities all brought their own established audiences to Brat's shows, describing them as "under-leveraged media property". The name of the network was inspired by the "Brat Pack" movies of the 1980s.

On September 5, 2017, Brat premiered Chicken Girls, which is Brat's longest-running series.

The most viewed episode on Brat is the ninth episode of season one of Mani, titled "I'm the Captain Now". It stands at over 22 million views as of December 30, 2023. The episode originally premiered on December 6, 2017.

In addition to teenage internet celebrities, Brat's content would also star people who have worked with Disney Channel and Nickelodeon.

In 2018, Brat premiered three shows that were different than its usual single-camera shows: Brat Chat which was a talk show hosted by Indiana Massara and Darius Marcell that premiered in June, The Talent Show which was a competition series to find Brat's next star (hosted by Casey Simpson and judged by Sofie Dossi, Bryce Xavier, and Jordyn Jones) that was released in August, and Hotel Du Loone which was a multi-cam sitcom and was released in June. A film based on Chicken Girls was released in 2018 as part of a deal with Studio L, a digital content division of Lionsgate. Before the film's release, Brat and Lionsgate amicably canceled their partnership.

Chicken Girls: The Movie was released on June 29, 2018 and became Brat's most popular project of all time, with over 40 million views as of December 30, 2023.

In December 2018, Brat premiered the Brat Holiday Spectacular starring Mackenzie Ziegler, Jules LeBlanc, Indiana Massara, Sofie Dossi, Aliyah Moulden, Emily Skinner, and Michelle Johnson.

In March 2019, Brat premiered Spring Breakaway starring Jules LeBlanc, Lilia Buckingham, and Anna Cathcart, William Franklyn-Miller, Kianna Naomi, David Banks, Claire Montgomery, Allen Perada and Colleen Elizabeth Miller.

In August 2019, Brat premiered Intern-in-Chief, which featured Jules LeBlanc, Riley Lewis, Indiana Massara, Aliyah Moulden, and Kiki Haynes.

In January, 2024, Brat acquired Horror website Crypt TV. A year later they acquired Electric Monster Media, owners of YouTube channels including React, and rebranded the studio as ZATV.

== Shows ==
=== Current shows ===
Title	Premiere date	No. seasons	Source(s)
Chicken Girls: College Years	August 2, 2022	2	
Junior's	September 26, 2022	1	
Together Forever	June 1, 2023	1	
Classroom Confidential	February 27, 2024	1	
How to Survive	October 1, 2024	1	
The 4pm Club	October 15, 2024	1	
Trapped In New Years Crossover New years Special	December 31, 2024	1	
Couples Council	January 10, 2025	1	
Juniors Cafe	January 31, 2025	1	
High School Heiress	May 9, 2025	1	

=== Films ===
Title	Premiere date	Source(s)
Chicken Girls: The Movie	June 29, 2018	
Brat Holiday Spectacular	December 21, 2018	
Spring Breakaway	March 15, 2019	
Intern-in-Chief	August 23, 2019	

=== Former programming ===
†	Denotes series is no longer available to view online

Title	Premiere date	Finale date	Seasons	Source(s)
Single-camera series
Misshaps †	June 12, 2017	August 7, 2017	1	
Cody & Lexy	July 27, 2017	August 17, 2017	1	
Keys	July 29, 2017	February 16, 2018	1	
Mani	August 30, 2017	November 29, 2023	8	
Spot The Dog	August 31, 2017	September 23, 2017	1	
Chicken Girls	September 5, 2017	October 31, 2023	11	
Flunky's Upset	September 27, 2017	November 2, 2017	1	
Attaway Appeal	September 28, 2017	November 10, 2017	1	
Afterschooled	January 11, 2018	February 8, 2018	1	
Overnights	March 2, 2018	March 30, 2018	1	
Total Eclipse	April 5, 2018	September 3, 2020	5	
Brobot	April 16, 2018	May 14, 2018	1	
Dirt	May 4, 2018	March 1, 2019	2	
Baby Doll Records	June 4, 2018	July 16, 2018	1	
Boss Cheer	June 21, 2018	February 21, 2019	2	
A Girl Named Jo	July 3, 2018	August 6, 2019	3	
Zoe Valentine	January 16, 2019	October 23, 2019	2	
On The Ropes	February 25, 2019	April 15, 2019	1	
Stuck	March 27, 2019	May 15, 2019	1	
Red Ruby	April 29, 2019	June 10, 2019	1	
Crown Lake	June 20, 2019	May 31, 2022	3	
Sunnyside Up	December 3, 2019	January 28, 2020	1	
Crazy Fast	December 4, 2019	January 22, 2020	1	
Stage Fright	March 26, 2020	May 14, 2020	1	
Attaway General	May 20, 2020	February 10, 2023	4	
Rooney's Last Roll	November 11, 2020	December 2, 2020	1	
Charmers	May 27, 2021	July 26, 2022	2	
Good Luck Have Fun	June 16, 2021	August 2, 2021	1	
Scarlett's Lab	August 6, 2021	August 27, 2021	1	
Two Christmases	December 22, 2021	December 25, 2021	1	
Chicken Girls: College Years	August 2, 2022	July 18, 2023	2	
The Four of Them	August 17, 2022	August 31, 2022	1	
Chicken Girls: Forever Team	November 3, 2022	November 24, 2022	1	
Talk show
Brat Chat	June 3, 2018	December 16, 2018	1	
Sketch comedies
My Not So Sweet 16 †	July 7, 2017	July 7, 2017	1	
Too Cool For School †	July 8, 2017	July 22, 2017	1	
Multi-camera series
Hotel Du Loone	June 27, 2018	August 22, 2018	1	
Reality series
The Pain of Painting †	July 19, 2017	August 9, 2017	1	
Sheltered †	July 21, 2017	August 11, 2017	1	
Chicken Girls: The Docuseries	October 1, 2020	November 12, 2020		
Heart and Soul	January 29, 2021	March 12, 2021		
Competition series
The Talent Show	August 27, 2018	October 11, 2018	1	

=== Facebook Watch ===
Title	Premiere date	No. seasons	Source(s)
Turnt	August 1, 2018	1	
The Shluv Family	June 29, 2020	1	
Random Acts of Magic	August 17, 2021	1	
Don't @ Me	October 21, 2021	1	

Brat had also filmed a show for their main channel on YouTube called Theater Kids, but it never aired.

== Other media ==
=== Other channels ===
==== B-Sides ====
In February 2020, Brat launched a YouTube channel called Music by Brat TV (formerly B-SIDES), which was dedicated to original songs by Brat stars, as well as covers of existing songs.

==== Past Your Bedtime (formerly known as Yearbook) ====
In February 2020, Brat launched a YouTube channel called "Yearbook" that features its stars in different series of videos, often interviews or recaps:

- Best Day Ever
- Chemistry
- Dear Diary
- Honor Roll
- @me
- Meet My Pet
- Portrait Mode
- Sip or Spill
- Study Hall
- Tuesday Tea

Some of Yearbook's videos had been posted on Brat's Instagram TV.

Yearbook was rebranded in February 2022 as "Past Your Bedtime", a channel featuring podcasts produced by Brat, such as:

- Sip or Spill (with Tati Mitchell & Louis Levanti)
- The Comment Section (with Drew Afualo)
- Anonymously Yours (with Teala Dunn)
- Keep Kickin’ (with Kai Novak)
- Interview With My Kid (with Jesse & Arlo Sullivan)
- Reading The Stars (with Antoni Bumba)
- Me Time (with Jack Wright)
- The Beauty Breakdown (with Glamzilla)
- Looking For
- I'm Literally Screaming (with Spencewuah)
- I'll Be Your Sister (with Ellie Zieler)
- Best Friends For Real (with Gabby Morrison & Jada Wesley)

=== Snapchat ===
Brat TV has also launched several Snapchat series that recap pop culture and current events primarily concerning notable influencers.

- Past Your Bedtime
- Hot Take
- Beauty Beat
- Get The Lewk

=== Books ===
In March 2019, Brat partnered with Sky Pony Press to release a junior novel based on the Chicken Girls series, entitled "Rhyme and the Runaway Twins".

=== IGTV ===
- Attaway Looks
- Brat Asks
- Brat Radio
- Fast Friends
- Fly So High
- Past Your Bedtime
- Trivia Night
- True or Nah
- Wednesday Wisdom

=== Podcast ===
In August 2019, Brat partnered with Art19 to produce a set of podcasts, the first of which served as a spin-off of Attaway Appeal.
