= Nickelodeon's Unfiltered =

American television game show

- Genre: Game show
- Presented by: Jay Pharoah
- Starring: Darci Lynne; Gabrielle Nevaeh Green; Lex Lumpkin
- Country of origin: United States
- Original language: English
- No. of seasons: 2
- No. of episodes: 41

Original release
- Network: Nickelodeon
- Release: July 11, 2020 – November 11, 2021

Nickelodeon's Unfiltered (also known simply as Unfiltered) is an American game show that aired on Nickelodeon from July 11, 2020 to November 11, 2021. The series is hosted by Jay Pharoah, with panelists Darci Lynne, Gabrielle Nevaeh Green, and Lex Lumpkin.

== Premise ==
Celebrities hide their true identities behind an animated filter and voice changer in the game show, while panelists are given clues and compete to identify the mystery guest.

== Production ==
On May 6, 2020, it was announced that the show was greenlit under the title Game Face along with Group Chat in the midst of the COVID-19 pandemic, necessitating remote filming. On June 26, 2020, it was announced that the show was retitled to Unfiltered, and would premiere on July 11, 2020, with host Jay Pharoah and panelists Darci Lynne, Gabrielle Nevaeh Green, and Lex Lumpkin.

On August 27, 2020, it was announced that Nickelodeon had ordered nine additional episodes for the series, that began airing on September 5. On January 7, 2021, it was announced that Nickelodeon had ordered a second season, alongside seven additional episodes of Side Hustle, which premiered later that night.

== Episodes ==
=== Series overview ===
| Season | Episodes | Originally released | |
| Season | Episodes | First released | Last released |
|---|---|---|---|
| 1 | 15 | July 11, 2020 | October 31, 2020 |
| 2 | 26 | January 7, 2021 | November 11, 2021 |

=== Season 1 (2020) ===
| No. overall | No. in season | Title | Original release date | Prod. code | U.S. viewers (millions) |
|---|---|---|---|---|---|
| 1 | 1 | "Pizza In Your Game Face!" | July 11, 2020 | 101 | 0.32 |
Special guest stars: The Big Show, Iain Armitage
| 2 | 2 | "Zombies Eat Unicorns!" | July 18, 2020 | 102 | 0.50 |
Special guest stars: Asher Angel, Candace Cameron Bure
| 3 | 3 | "Avocado Toasted Piñatas!" | July 25, 2020 | 103 | 0.36 |
Special guest stars: David Dobrik, Buddy Valastro
| 4 | 4 | "Corgi Rock Party!" | August 1, 2020 | 104 | 0.53 |
Special guest stars: Liza Koshy, Gabriel Iglesias
| 5 | 5 | "It's Raining Penguins!" | August 8, 2020 | 105 | 0.33 |
Special guest stars: Joshua Bassett, Shaun White
| 6 | 6 | "Robots Love Cereal!" | August 15, 2020 | 106 | 0.33 |
Special guest stars: Chance the Rapper, Coyote Peterson
| 7 | 7 | "Porcupines Rock High Tops!" | September 5, 2020 | 107 | 0.32 |
Special guest stars: Tony Hawk, Ne-Yo
| 8 | 8 | "Honey Bears Chew Gumballs!" | September 12, 2020 | 108 | 0.37 |
Special guest stars: Keke Palmer, Ally Brooke
| 9 | 9 | "Hot Dog Dance Party!" | September 19, 2020 | 109 | 0.33 |
Special guest stars: Tiffany Haddish, James Murray
| 10 | 10 | "Cactus Pop Tarts!" | September 26, 2020 | 110 | 0.34 |
Special guest panelist: Young Dylan Special guest stars: Peyton List, Tom Kenny
| 11 | 11 | "Let's Eat Electric Cake!" | October 3, 2020 | 111 | 0.28 |
Special guest panelist: Iain Armitage Special guest stars: H.E.R., Cooper Barnes
| 12 | 12 | "This Planet is Cuckoo!" | October 10, 2020 | 112 | 0.48 |
Special guest stars: Kel Mitchell, Rutledge Wood
| 13 | 13 | "Burgers in Your Laundry!" | October 17, 2020 | 113 | 0.49 |
Special guest stars: Frankie Grande, Trevor Daniel
| 14 | 14 | "Super Cats & Fierce Ice Cream!" | October 24, 2020 | 114 | 0.49 |
Special guest panelist: Miya Cech Special guest stars: Tyra Banks, Rico Rodriguez
| 15 | 15 | "Happy Slime-o-ween!" | October 31, 2020 | 115 | 0.47 |
Special guest stars: Duff Goldman, Bill Nye

=== Season 2 (2021) ===
| No. overall | No. in season | Title | Original release date | Prod. code | U.S. viewers (millions) |
|---|---|---|---|---|---|
| 16 | 1 | "Donut vs. The Volcano" | January 7, 2021 | 201 | 0.39 |
Special guest stars: Ninja, Tim Tebow
| 17 | 2 | "Calling All Funflowers!" | January 14, 2021 | 202 | 0.43 |
Special guest panelists: Ryan Alessi, Miya Cech Special guest stars: Lindsey Vonn, Cat Deeley
| 18 | 3 | "Goofballs from Outer Space!" | January 21, 2021 | 203 | 0.51 |
Special guest panelists: Ryan Alessi, Chinguun Sergelen Special guest stars: Pete Wentz, Candace Parker
| 19 | 4 | "As Seen On Burrito" | January 28, 2021 | 204 | 0.40 |
Special guest panelists: Ryan Alessi, Kate Godfrey Special guest stars: Taraji P. Henson, Yvette Nicole Brown
| 20 | 5 | "Bunny Money" | February 4, 2021 | 205 | 0.56 |
Special guest panelists: Miya Cech, Asher Angel Special guest stars: Johnny Orlando, Lincoln Loud (Note: Lincoln Loud was voiced by Asher Bishop.)
| 21 | 6 | "Be My Valentine!" | February 11, 2021 | 206 | 0.35 |
Special guest stars: Gaten Matarazzo, Lele Pons
| 22 | 7 | "This DJ is Bananas!" | February 18, 2021 | 207 | 0.32 |
Special guest panelist: Chinguun Sergelen Special guest stars: Craig Robinson, Zach King
| 23 | 8 | "Aye, Aye, Trash Can!" | February 25, 2021 | 208 | 0.30 |
Special guest panelists: Miya Cech, Chinguun Sergelen Special guest stars: Simone Biles, Sky Brown
| 24 | 9 | "Otter Docs & Polka Dots" | March 6, 2021 | 209 | 0.34 |
Special guest panelist: Miya Cech Special guest stars: Ty Dolla Sign, Kat Graham
| 25 | 10 | "Wordy Worms and Legal Eagles!" | April 10, 2021 | 211 | 0.16 |
Special guest panelists: Jules LeBlanc, Jayden Bartels Special guest stars: Marshawn Lynch, Mario Lopez
| 26 | 11 | "Paint the Town Sloppy" | May 29, 2021 | 210 | 0.24 |
Special guest stars: Unspeakable, Jodie Sweetin
| 27 | 12 | "I'm Kind of a Big Dill" | June 17, 2021 | 212 | 0.27 |
Special guest stars: Terry Crews, Andre Drummond Special appearance by: Isaiah Crews
| 28 | 13 | "Strong Beef & Flying Teeth!" | June 21, 2021 | 213 | 0.28 |
Special guest panelist: Chase Vacnin Special guest stars: Tyler Posey, Mckenna Grace
| 29 | 14 | "Dreaming of an Awful Waffle!" | June 22, 2021 | 214 | 0.28 |
Special guest panelist: Chase Vacnin Special guest stars: Bob Saget, Rebecca Zamolo
| 30 | 15 | "Kickin' Carrots and Bubbly Tea!" | June 23, 2021 | 215 | 0.31 |
Special guest panelists: Chase Vacnin, Lili Brennan Special guest stars: Laura Marano, Miles Brown
| 31 | 16 | "Poppin' Starfish and Rockin' Roaches!" | July 15, 2021 | 216 | 0.37 |
Special guest panelists: Mitchell Berg, Jayden Bartels, Lili Brennan Special guest stars: Saweetie, Austin Mahone
| 32 | 17 | "Why Did the Bear Cross the Road?" | August 7, 2021 | 217 | 0.31 |
Special guest panelists: Lili Brennan, Jayden Bartels, Mitchell Berg Special guest stars: Joel McHale, Jimmie Allen
| 33 | 18 | "That's A Corny Dog!" | August 14, 2021 | 218 | 0.26 |
Special guest panelist: Miya Cech Special guest stars: Rob Gronkowski, Adam Rippon
| 34 | 19 | "Wrestling Slimy Snails!" | August 21, 2021 | 219 | 0.27 |
Special guest stars: Anna Cathcart, Bobby Moynihan
| 35 | 20 | "Gettin' Groovy With A Smoothie!" | August 28, 2021 | 220 | 0.21 |
Special guest panelist: Miya Cech Special guest stars: Rainn Wilson, Padma Lakshmi
| 36 | 21 | "Fan the Flames!" | September 11, 2021 | 221 | 0.28 |
Special guest panelists: Telci Huynh, Artyon Celestine Special guest stars: Wayne Brady, Anna Camp
| 37 | 22 | "Jazz Hams!" | September 18, 2021 | 222 | 0.23 |
Special guest panelists: Telci Huynh, Lili Brennan, Chase Vacnin, Artyon Celestine Special guest stars: Nelly, Ben Feldman
| 38 | 23 | "Spilling the T-Rex" | September 25, 2021 | 223 | 0.21 |
Special guest panelists: Chase Vacnin, Kensington Tallman Special guest stars: Xavier Woods, Avani Gregg
| 39 | 24 | "Birds of a Feather Skate Together!" | October 2, 2021 | 224 | 0.16 |
Special guest panelists: Chase Vacnin, Kensington Tallman, Artyon Celestine Special guest stars: Tony Hale, Hayley Kiyoko
| 40 | 25 | "Ah Rats! Who Let the Fox Out?" | October 9, 2021 | 225 | 0.25 |
Special guest panelists: Kensington Tallman, Chase Vacnin, Telci Huynh, Lili Brennan Special guest stars: James Maslow, Loren Gray
| 41 | 26 | "Rollin' with the Fun Guy!" | November 11, 2021 | 226 | 0.25 |
Special guest panelists: Chase Vacnin, Wolfgang Schaffer, Telci Huynh Special guest stars: Tan France, That Girl Lay Lay

=== Special (2021) ===
| Title | Original release date | Prod. code | U.S. viewers (millions) |
|---|---|---|---|
| "Unfiltered: The Best Of" | May 29, 2021 | 999 | 0.28 |

== Ratings ==
Viewership and ratings per season of Nickelodeon's Unfiltered
| Season | Episodes | First aired | | Last aired | | Avg. viewers (millions) |
| Season | Episodes | Date | Viewers (millions) | Date | Viewers (millions) | Avg. viewers (millions) |
|---|---|---|---|---|---|---|
| 1 | 15 | July 11, 2020 | 0.32 | October 31, 2020 | 0.47 | 0.40 |
| 2 | 26 | January 7, 2021 | 0.39 | November 11, 2021 | 0.25 | 0.30 |
