= Darci Lynne =

American ventriloquist (born 2004)

Darci Lynne Farmer
- Born: Darci Lynne Farmer; October 12, 2004 (age 21); Oklahoma City, Oklahoma, U.S.
- Occupations: Ventriloquist; singer; musician
- Years active: 2016–present
- Television: Little Big Shots; America's Got Talent
- Website: www.darcilynne.com

Darci Lynne Farmer (born October 12, 2004) is an American ventriloquist and singer. She has been credited with the revival of ventriloquism, earning praise and numerous accolades for her work.

Born in Oklahoma, Farmer developed an interest in singing from a young age, but was held back by her shyness before audiences. Inspired by performances by ventriloquists including Terry Fator, she began to practice ventriloquism, performing in a local talent contest with her first puppet in 2014. Following her success in the competition, Farmer received coaching and assistance from other performers, allowing her to win additional contests over the next two years.

Farmer came to national attention when she appeared on Little Big Shots in 2016, but gained greater recognition and acclaim when she won the twelfth season of America's Got Talent the following year. Since then, she has made numerous appearances on other television shows and has held several tours with her puppet characters, with Petunia Rabbit being her main character.

== Early life ==
Darci Lynne Farmer was born on October 12, 2004. She is from Oklahoma City, Oklahoma. Lynne's parents are Clarke and Misty Farmer, and she has three brothers, Nate, Dalton, and Nick. Growing up, Lynne loved to sing, but was hesitant to perform in front of an audience. Her parents encouraged her to overcome her shyness by participating in the 2014 International Cinderella Scholarship Program, where she was crowned International Mini Miss. At the pageant, she met International Teen titleholder Laryssa Bonacquisti, a young ventriloquist who inspired her to try ventriloquism herself.

In 2014, after a month's preparation using tips provided by Bonacquisti, Lynne entered Edmond's Got Talent and won first prize. Ventriloquy coach Gary Owen was so impressed by Lynne's performance that he offered to serve as her trainer and business manager. Since then Lynne has worked with both Owen and vocal coach Tiana Plemons. The following year, she won first place in both Oklahoma Kids and the junior division of Oklahoma's Got Talent. She also won Broadway, Specialty Acts, and Entertainer of the Year at American Kids in Branson, Missouri.

Until she began homeschooling in eighth grade, Lynne attended Deer Creek Middle School near her home in Edmond, Oklahoma. She missed the first day of seventh grade when she appeared live on America's Got Talent.

== Professional career ==
=== Little Big Shots and America's Got Talent ===
In March 2016, Lynne made an appearance on Little Big Shots, singing "I Want to Be a Cowboy's Sweetheart" with her puppet Katie, a cowgirl. In July 2016, she became the first child ventriloquist to perform at an evening show in the 40-year history of the Vent Haven ConVENTion, where she fronted for ventriloquists Kevin Johnson and Todd Oliver. In March 2017, she appeared on the British version of Little Big Shots, again performing "I Want to Be a Cowboy's Sweetheart" with Katie.

Lynne competed in the twelfth season of America's Got Talent in mid-2017. During the first episode, which was broadcast on May 30, Lynne and her puppet Petunia performed "Summertime" from Porgy and Bess. Judge Mel B praised the act and pressed her Golden Buzzer, allowing Lynne to bypass the judge cuts and go directly to the quarterfinals. The video of the act became the most viewed in the show's history within 30 hours of its release and later placed fourth on YouTube's list of top 10 trending videos of 2017.

For Lynne's first live presentation after her Golden Buzzer performance, she performed "Who's Lovin' You" with her mouse puppet Oscar. She sang "(You Make Me Feel Like) A Natural Woman" in the semifinals with puppet Edna Doorknocker.

In her final round of competition, Lynne performed "With a Little Help from My Friends" with Petunia and Oscar. Judge Simon Cowell predicted: "I think you're going to win." During the finale in episode 22, Lynne sang "Anything You Can Do" with season two winner Terry Fator. After she was announced the winner, NBC said that she had received the most votes out of any finale performance in the show's history.

=== Darci Lynne and Friends Live and Grand Ole Opry ===
Lynne was a guest on The Ellen DeGeneres Show in September 2017. She appeared in Jeff Dunham's video, The Haunted House on Dunham Hill, in which she takes three of her puppets (Petunia, Oscar, and Edna) trick-or-treating at Dunham's home, where they encounter him and some of his puppets (Walter, Achmed, Peanut, and Bubba J). In November 2017, she made a guest appearance at a Terry Fator performance at the Hard Rock Hotel & Casino in Tulsa. She also appeared alongside Pentatonix in A Very Pentatonix Christmas Special, performing "O Easter Egg" (an Easter-themed parody of "O Christmas Tree") with Petunia. Lynne announced a national tour, Darci Lynne and Friends Live. Starting with five locations and beginning in January and February 2018, it was later expanded to 52 dates taking place between January 2018 and January 2019, including nine Christmas performances in November and December called Rocking Around the Christmas Tree with Darci Lynne and Friends.

Lynne appeared as part of the charity event One Night with the Stars at Madison Square Garden the following month. Her December 16 homecoming show, iHeartMedia and KJ103 Present Darci Lynne, sold out within six minutes of the tickets going on sale. As a result, a matinee show earlier the same day and then later another two shows on December 17 were added. On December 31, she performed at Caesars Palace in Las Vegas along with Fergie as part of a New Year's Eve event.

In January 2018, Lynne appeared on Today with Oscar, performing "Who's Lovin' You", and in March, she appeared on the Grand Ole Opry, as well as making a cameo appearance on the Nickelodeon Kids' Choice Awards. She returned to Little Big Shots in April, where she performed "Shout" by the Isley Brothers with Oscar. In May 2018, Lynne appeared as a guest on Pickler & Ben. In July 2018, she participated in the 2018 Starkey Hearing Foundation gala. In August 2018, she returned to America's Got Talent as a guest, singing "Show Off" from The Drowsy Chaperone with Petunia. In September, she appeared as a guest in an episode of Kids Baking Championship. In November 2018, she was a guest on Steve, where she performed "Rudolph the Red-Nosed Reindeer" with Petunia, and later sang "Jingle Bell Rock" with Petunia during NBC's Christmas in Rockefeller Center telecast.

In December 2018, Lynne returned to both the Grand Ole Opry and Pickler & Ben, and voiced Daisy in an episode of Fancy Nancy. She also starred in and hosted Darci Lynne: My Hometown Christmas. The NBC holiday television special included both ventriloquial singing with her four main puppets (Petunia, Oscar, Edna and Katie) and non-ventriloquial singing. Duets were performed with Lindsey Stirling, Toby Keith, Kristin Chenoweth, and Pentatonix and Hunter Hayes appeared as guests. Also included was a sketch featuring the four America's Got Talent judges: Simon Cowell, Howie Mandel, Heidi Klum, and Mel B. Lonnie Chavis was the announcer for the special.

=== America's Got Talent: The Champions and more touring ===
In January 2019, Lynne was a guest in the Food Network show Winner Cake All. She returned to America's Got Talent as a contestant on America's Got Talent: The Champions. In the preliminaries, she performed a medley of "Nutbush City Limits" and "Proud Mary" with Oscar. Although she was voted in the top three, she did not receive enough votes to continue to the next round. She was brought back as a wild card act and performed "O mio babbino caro" with Petunia in the finals. During the results show, she and Bill Barretta performed "Can't Smile Without You", with Lynne singing as Edna and Baretta as Rowlf the Dog from The Muppets. She ended up as runner-up behind magician Shin Lim, the winner of season 13.

Announced in October 2018, Lynne began a second tour in February 2019, called Darci Lynne and Friends: Fresh Out of the Box. In March 2019, Lynne appeared as a guest for two stops of the Barbie Be Anything Tour. In April 2019, she appeared in a WE Day event in Washington. In September 2019, Lynne returned to America's Got Talent as a guest performer again, along with season 12 finalist Preacher Lawson; Lynne performed "It's a Man's Man's Man's World" with Petunia. In November 2019, she appeared as a guest on an episode of the sketch-comedy series All That with her puppet Petunia, and also appeared in a WE Day event in Vancouver.

In February 2020, Lynne appeared as a guest on The Kelly Clarkson Show, performing "Something's Got a Hold on Me" with Oscar. This was followed by another appearance on the show in April. In July 2020, Lynne became a panelist on Nickelodeon's Unfiltered, hosted by Jay Pharoah. She made a second appearance on All That as the musical guest, performing "Something's Got a Hold on Me" with Oscar.

In August 2020, Lynne returned to America's Got Talent as a guest performer again, where she debuted her one-eyed Australian monster puppet Ivan. In April 2021, Lynne appeared in the Side Hustle episode "Make-A-Mutt" as The Wombat. In June, she appeared on The Ellen DeGeneres Show again. In July 2021, Lynne started a new tour, called My Lips Are Sealed (Except When They're Not), which would run until November 2022. In August 2021, Lynne returned to America's Got Talent as a guest for a fourth time, and performed "Let the Good Times Roll" by Louis Jordan with Oscar. In April 2022, she appeared in the film A Cowgirl's Song alongside Cheryl Ladd, Savannah Lee May, and Jason Alan Smith. It was Lynne's first time acting in a feature film.

In July 2022, during season 17 of America's Got Talent, Simon Cowell shared his top 15 favorite Golden Buzzer moments in the show's history. Lynne placed second on the list. The following month, Lynne and Terry Fator made guest appearances during the show's 17th-season finale, performing "Over the Rainbow" alongside Celia Muñoz, an object ventriloquist.

In 2024, Lynne was confirmed to participate in America's Got Talent: Fantasy League. In her qualifying performance with Heidi Klum as her mentor, she played the guitar while Petunia rocked out by moving on her own. Despite criticism from Mel B and Cowell, Darci got enough votes to move on to the semi-finals. During the semi-finals, she changed her act yet again by performing on her own which received praise from Cowell. Lynne did not qualify for the finals.

== Reception ==
Lynne's success on America's Got Talent has been credited with helping return ventriloquism to the attention of the general public. Bill King of BuddyTV described Lynne's final performance on the show as "so seamless you need to be reminded of its difficulty".

Talking to USA Today, Terry Fator said of Lynne that "she is, at 12 years old, one of the most unbelievable, perfect ventriloquists I've ever seen, and she'll only get better". He also called her "one of the most talented human beings on the planet" in an interview with Billboard.

Ventriloquist Sammy King said in an interview with The Fountain Hills Times that "she is very gifted, a great singer and has tremendous comedic timing". Jay Johnson described her on his personal blog as "a wonderfully talented girl" with "near perfect" ventriloquism technique and "singing chops [that] could stand alone without the puppet assistance", whose "dedication to the art and ... young spirit will influence a generation of belly talkers to come".

In August 2020, the Edmond Historical Society and Museum opened an exhibit titled "Darci Lynne's Got Talent". Dedicated to Lynne, it includes clothing from her television performances, her first practice puppets, tour posters, and scripts.

== Filmography ==
=== Film ===
Year	Title	Role	Notes
2022	A Cowgirl's Song	Brooke Mays	Streaming film
2024	Reagan	Drowning Girl	

=== Television ===
Year	Title	Role	Notes
2016, 2018	Little Big Shots	Herself	Performer (puppets: Katie, Oscar); episodes: "A One, Two Punch", "Ventriloquist, Little Miss Sunshine"
2017–present	America's Got Talent	Herself	Contestant (season 12); Musical guest or performer (seasons 13–17); (puppets: Petunia, Oscar, Edna Doorknocker, Ivan); Episode: "AGT 20th Birthday Party" (w/ Petunia)
2017	A Very Pentatonix Christmas	Herself	TV special; performer (puppet: Petunia)
2018	Fancy Nancy	Daisy	Voice role; episode: "Nancy and the Nice List"
2018	Kids Baking Championship	Herself	Performer (puppet: Petunia); episode: "You're in the Ballpark"
2018	Darci Lynne: My Hometown Christmas	Herself	TV special; host and performer (puppets: Petunia, Oscar, Edna Doorknocker, Katie)
2019	America's Got Talent: The Champions	Herself	Performer (puppets: Petunia, Oscar, Edna Doorknocker); 3 episodes
2019	Camp Nick	Herself	Episode: "Say Goodbye to Annie LeBlanc & Jayden Bartels!"
2019–2020	All That	Herself	Performer (puppets: Petunia, Oscar); 2 episodes
2019	Winner Cake All	Herself	Performer (puppet: Petunia); episode: "Darci Lynne's Birthday"
2020	Scooby-Doo and Guess Who?	Herself	Voice role and performer (puppet: Petunia); episode: "Too Many Dummies"
2020	Ryan's Mystery Playdate	Herself	Performer (puppets: Petunia, Cook Daddy); episode: "Ryan's Chatterin' Playdate"
2020–2021	Nickelodeon's Unfiltered	Herself	Panelist
2021	Side Hustle	The Wombat	Episode: "Make-a-Mutt"
2024	America's Got Talent: Fantasy League	Herself	Performer (puppet: Petunia); 2 episodes

Preceded by Grace VanderWaal	America's Got Talent winner Season 12 (Summer 2017)	Succeeded by Shin Lim
