= Shelby Simmons =

American actress

- Occupation: Actress
- Years active: 2017–present

Shelby Simmons is an American actress. On television, she is known for her roles in the Netflix series Prince of Peoria (2018–2019) and the Disney Channel series Bunk'd (2019–2021, 2024). Her films include Stargirl (2020).

== Early life ==
Simmons began acting in school plays at a young age, including a middle-school production of Shrek, in which she played Princess Fiona.

== Career ==
Simmons had her first main role as Sydney Quinn in the Netflix Prince of Peoria in 2018. Her character is described as a straight-A with a wild side. She also played Natalie in the second season of the Disney Channel series Andi Mack.

In 2019, Simmons joined the main cast of Bunk'd on Disney Channel as Ava King for its fourth and fifth seasons, with a guest appearance in the show's series finale. She reprised the role in Raven’s Home.

Simmons featured in the 2020 films Stargirl on Disney+ as Hillari Kimble and Selfie Dad as Hannah Marcus.

Simmons was cast as Sophia in One Stupid Thing in December 2023, based on the book of the same name. She has an upcoming role in the interactive slasher film Slay Day.

== Personal life ==
Simmons is an active pet owner, owning a dog and a white rabbit. She is also a Christian.

== Filmography ==
Key
†	Denotes productions that have not yet been released

=== Film ===
Year	Title	Role	Notes
2020	Selfie Dad	Hannah Marcus	
2020	Stargirl	Hillari Kimble	Disney+ film
2022	Night at the Museum: Kahmunrah Rises Again	Mia	
2025	A Big Bold Beautiful Journey	Stage Manager	
2025	One Stupid Thing	Sophia	
2026	The Gates	Tiffany	
2026	Slay Day†	Renee	

=== Television ===
Year	Title	Role	Notes
2017	Game Shakers	Shanelle	1 episode
2017	The Bugaloos	Courage	Television film
2018	School of Rock	Jacqueline	1 episode
2018	Andi Mack	Natalie	3 episodes
2018–2019	Prince of Peoria	Sydney	Main Role
2019–2021, 2024	Bunk'd	Ava King	Main Role (Seasons 4–5) Guest star (Season 7)
2019	Henry Danger	Joss Moss	1 episode
2020	Raven's Home	Ava King	1 episode
2022	Snow Day	Claire	Television film
