= That Girl Lay Lay (TV series) =

American comedy television series

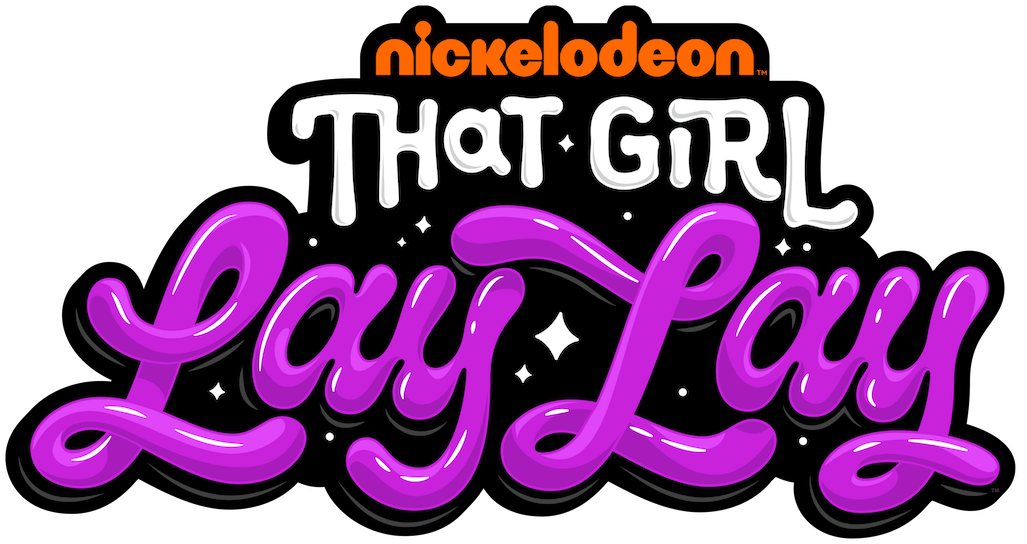
- Genre: Comedy
- Created by: David A. Arnold
- Starring: That Girl Lay Lay; Gabrielle Nevaeh Green; Tiffany Daniels; Thomas Hobson; Peyton Perrine III; Caleb Brown; Elijah M. Cooper
- Theme music composer: Wendell Hanes; Jasmine Hanes
- Opening theme: "Who's Coming Out The App?" by That Girl Lay Lay
- Ending theme: "Who's Coming Out The App?" (instrumental)
- Composer: Wendell Hanes
- Country of origin: United States
- Original language: English
- No. of seasons: 2
- No. of episodes: 45

Production
- Executive producers: David A. Arnold; Ron Hart; John D. Beck; Will Packer; Carolyn Newman; Warren Hutcherson; Sabrina Wind
- Producers: Toy Monique Hawkins; Julie Tsutsui; Peggy Cheng; Patty Gary-Cox; Natalie Duvoisin
- Cinematography: Robin Strickland
- Camera setup: Multi-camera
- Running time: 22 minutes
- Production companies: WP; Manor House Entertainment; Nickelodeon Productions

Original release
- Network: Nickelodeon
- Release: September 23, 2021 – March 20, 2024

That Girl Lay Lay is an American comedy television series created by David A. Arnold that aired on Nickelodeon from September 23, 2021 to March 20, 2024. The series stars That Girl Lay Lay, Gabrielle Nevaeh Green, Tiffany Daniels, Thomas Hobson, Peyton Perrine III, Caleb Brown, and Elijah M. Cooper.

== Premise ==
Struggling to make her mark at school and needing a best friend to talk to, Sadie wishes that Lay Lay, an artificially intelligent avatar from a personal affirmation app, were real and could help teach her how to stand out. When her wish comes true and Lay Lay is magically brought to life, they navigate life as teenagers and discover who they truly are, all while trying to keep Lay Lay's identity hidden.

== Cast ==
=== Main ===
- That Girl Lay Lay as Lay Lay, an artificially intelligent phone avatar that comes to life in the form of a human teen girl with special abilities
- Gabrielle Nevaeh Green as Sadie, a girl who owned the phone avatar version of Lay Lay until it came to life
- Tiffany Daniels as Trish, Sadie's mother
- Thomas Hobson as Bryce, Sadie's father
- Peyton Perrine III as Marky, Sadie's brother
- Caleb Brown as Jeremy (season 1), Sadie and Lay Lay's classmate
- Elijah M. Cooper as Cobo (season 2)

=== Recurring ===
- Andrea Barber as Principal Willingham, the principal of East Packer High School
- Kensington Tallman as Tiffany, the most popular girl in school
- Ishmel Sahid as Woody, the owner of Boombox Burger
- Anna-Grace Arnold as Gigi, an emo girl who only listens to herself
- Sean Phillip Glasgow as Lugnut
- Archer Vattano as Scoot, Marky's best friend
- Graydon Yosowitz as Graydon Waydon

== Production ==
On March 18, 2021, That Girl Lay Lay was ordered to series by Nickelodeon for 13 episodes, set to star Alaya High, who is otherwise known as Lay Lay. The series was created by David A. Arnold, who also serves as showrunner, and is produced by Will Packer Productions. Production for the series began in summer 2021. David A. Arnold, Will Packer, Carolyn Newman, John Beck, and Ron Hart serve as executive producers. On July 2, 2021, it was announced that Gabrielle Nevaeh Green as Sadie, Peyton Perrine III as Marky, Tiffany Daniels as Trish, Thomas Hobson as Bryce, and Caleb Brown as Jeremy all joined the main cast. On August 26, 2021, it was announced that the series would premiere on September 23, 2021.

On January 28, 2022, the series was renewed for a second season, which premiered on July 14, 2022.

On March 19, 2024, it was announced that the series would end after two seasons. The finale aired March 20, 2024.

== Episodes ==
=== Series overview ===
Season	Episodes	Originally released	
Season	Episodes	First released	Last released
1	13	September 23, 2021	December 9, 2021
2	32	July 14, 2022	March 20, 2024

=== Season 1 (2021) ===
No. overall	No. in season	Title	Directed by	Written by	Original release date	Prod. code	U.S. viewers (millions)
1	1	"Out the App"	Wendy Faraone	David A. Arnold	September 23, 2021	101	0.27
Sadie Alexander, a teenage girl, makes a wish that her hype-girl avatar, Lay Lay, would come to life. When she falls asleep, Lay Lay magically transforms into an actual human, so Sadie has to keep her a secret, passing her off as an exchange student from Houston, or else people will grow suspicious. Lay Lay convinces Sadie that she could stand out by running for class president against Tiffany, the popular girl in school. Guest stars: Andrea Barber, Kensington Tallman, Emma Winnick, Christine Rodriguez
2	2	"Lay Lay Lies Lies"	Wendy Faraone	Emily Winter & William Luke Schreiber	September 30, 2021	102	0.26
After Lay Lay insults Trish's dinner, she and Sadie have to clean the dishes. Sadie then teaches Lay Lay about little white lies, such as the family praising "Trish's Dishes" when in reality they don't like them. Lay Lay takes the white lie up to extreme when she says that Trish's Dishes should be made everyday, which prompts Sadie and Lay Lay to make their own dinner, with disastrous results. Meanwhile, Marky and Bryce tries to make money from selling burger mugs to Woody (Ishmel Sahid). Guest stars: Ishmel Sahid, Isaiah Morgan Absent: Caleb Brown as Jeremy
3	3	"You-Go-Girl-Kart"	Wendy Faraone	Desia Gore	October 7, 2021	103	0.19
Lay Lay decides to join the auto club so she could make a stylish ride, but Sadie, who feels she will mess it up, joins as well. When Lugnut (Sean Philip Glasgow) insults them by saying building cars is only for boys, which gets them to try to build their own ride to counter Lugnut. Meanwhile, Marky and Jeremy notice Trish's new invention and want to promote it. Guest stars: Andrea Barber, Kensington Tallman, Emma Winnick, Sean Philip Glasgow, Josh Banday Absent: Tiffany Daniels as Trish, Thomas Hobson as Bryce
4	4	"Lay Lay the Legendary"	Leonard R. Garner Jr.	Randi Barnes	October 14, 2021	105	0.28
Guest star: Kate Flannery
5	5	"Ha-Lay-Lay-Ween"	Jody Margolin Hahn	Randi Barnes	October 21, 2021	110	0.25
Guest stars: Andrea Barber, Kensington Tallman, Ishmel Sahid, Christine Rodriguez, Josh Banday Absent: Tiffany Daniels as Trish, Thomas Hobson as Bryce
6	6	"BoomBox Burger Bop"	Leonard R. Garner Jr.	Anthony Hill	October 28, 2021	106	0.18
Guest stars: Andrea Barber, Ishmel Sahid, Sean Philip Glasgow, Graydon Yosowitz
7	7	"Ha-Lay-Lay-Lujah"	Leonard R. Garner Jr.	Angel Hobbs	November 4, 2021	111	0.26
When the Alexanders attend their monthly visit to Church, Lay Lay has a whiff of Bryce's special ice cream without permission, and starts to suffer severe overheating. Sadie must convince Lay Lay to tell the truth should her glitch stop. Meanwhile, Marky pretends to be sick to get out of going to Church so he can watch a new movie. Guest stars: Ishmel Sahid, David A. Arnold, Lonyé Perrine, Roz Ryan Absent: Caleb Brown as Jeremy
8	8	"That Dude Dylan"	Kim Fields	Desia Gore	November 11, 2021	108	0.49
Guest stars: Dylan Gilmer, Ishmel Sahid, Sean Philip Glasgow, Billy Van Zandt, Everly Carganilla Absent: Tiffany Daniels as Trish
9	9	"Mozzarella Heads"	Kim Fields	John D. Beck & Ron Hart	November 11, 2021	107	0.36
Guest star: Natalie Lander Absent: Thomas Hobson as Bryce
10	10	"Lay Lay & Sadie's Big Hair Adventure"	Leonard R. Garner Jr.	Angel Hobbs	November 18, 2021	104	0.31
Guest stars: Kym Whitley, Ishmel Sahid Absent: Caleb Brown as Jeremy
11	11	"Make Room for Lay Lay"	Jody Margolin Hahn	David A. Arnold	November 25, 2021	109	0.27
Guest stars: Kensington Tallman, Ishmel Sahid, Tara Perry
12	12	"Fa-La-La-La-La-La-La-Lay-Lay"	Wendy Faraone	Emily Winter & William Luke Schreiber	December 2, 2021	112	0.30
Guest stars: Andrea Barber, Ishmel Sahid, Pyper Braun
13	13	"Granny Fae Fae & Lay Lay"	Morenike Joela Evans	John D. Beck & Ron Hart	December 9, 2021	113	0.23
When Sadie does not get the part she wanted in the play and Lay Lay's prank on the director goes wrong, Principal Willingham demands she sees Lay Lay's parents otherwise she will get expelled. Knowing Lay Lay is not from Houston, Sadie decides to disguise herself as her grandmother Fae Fae; despite the difficulties, the conference goes well and Lay Lay is off the hook. The episode ends on a cliffhanger when Marky overhears Sadie talking about Lay Lay's true identity. Guest stars: Andrea Barber, Graydon Yosowitz

=== Season 2 (2022–24) ===
No. overall	No. in season	Title	Directed by	Written by	Original release date	Prod. code	U.S. viewers (millions)
14	1	"Ain't That a Glitch"	Wendy Faraone	David A. Arnold and John D. Beck & Ron Hart	July 14, 2022	201–202	0.25
Guest stars: Joey Bragg, Sanai Victoria
15	2	"The Burger Games"	Wendy Faraone	Randi Barnes	July 21, 2022	203	0.15
Guest stars: Andrea Barber, Ishmel Sahid, Elijah M. Cooper, Kensington Tallman, Anna-Grace Arnold, Wilkie Ferguson
16	3	"Lay Lay's Beauty Shop Day Day"	Kim Fields	Desia Gore	July 28, 2022	204	0.13
Guest stars: Ishmel Sahid, Sean Philip Glasgow, Roz Ryan, Lonyé Perrine, Elijah M. Cooper, Archer Vattano, Marcus Folmar
17	4	"Lay Lay Gets a Pet Pet"	Kim Fields	Emily Winter & William Luke Schreiber	August 4, 2022	205	0.20
Guest stars: Andrea Barber, Ishmel Sahid, Anna-Grace Arnold, Elijah M. Cooper, Archer Vattano
18	5	"Dylan and Rebecca's Cleve-Land-Land Adventure"	Jody Margolin Hahn	Desia Gore	September 15, 2022	210	0.17
Guest stars: Young Dylan, Celina Smith, Archer Vattano, Joey Bragg, Brittany Ross
19	6	"Fami-Lay-Lay-Reunion"	Leonard R. Garner Jr.	Angel Hobbs	September 22, 2022	207	0.16
Guest stars: Ramon Reed, Travis Wolfe Jr., Patricia Belcher, Gregg Daniel, Terrell Lee, Napiera Groves Boykin Absent: Peyton Perrine III as Marky
20	7	"Bars"	Jody Margolin Hahn	Freddie Gutierrez	September 29, 2022	206	0.19
Guest star: Andrea Barber, Darryl "DMC" McDaniels, Kensington Tallman, Sean Philip Glasgow, Graydon Yosowitz, Elijah M. Cooper
21	8	"Freaky Fri-Day-Day"	Leonard R. Garner Jr.	David A. Arnold	October 13, 2022	208	0.23
Guest stars: Kensington Tallman, Menik Gooneratne, Boone Nelson, Jane Carr Absent: Peyton Perrine III as Marky
22	9	"Lay Lay's Line Line Dance Dance"	Leonard R. Garner Jr.	Randi Barnes	October 20, 2022	209	0.14
Guest stars: Andrea Barber, Elijah M. Cooper, Josh Banday
23	10	"Lay Lay's Par-Tay-Tay"	Kelly Elizabeth Jensen	Emily Winter & William Luke Schreiber	October 27, 2022	212	0.20
Guest stars: Kensington Tallman, Elijah M. Cooper, Graydon Yosowitz, Anna-Grace Arnold, Good NEWZ Girls
24	11	"How Zelda Got Her Groove Back Back"	Wendy Faraone	Freddie Gutierrez	December 15, 2022	213	0.09
Guest stars: Andrea Barber, Ishmel Sahid, Parvesh Cheena, Elijah M. Cooper, Archer Vattano, Graydon Yosowitz
25	12	"The App Came Back"	Evelyn Belasco	John D. Beck & Ron Hart	December 25, 2022	211	0.26
Guest stars: Andrea Barber, Ishmel Sahid, Kensington Tallman, Elijah M. Cooper, Graydon Yosowitz, Miia Harris
26	13	"The Packer Packer Bowl"	Wendy Faraone	John D. Beck & Ron Hart	February 16, 2023	217	0.17
Guest stars: Isaiah Crews as Munchy, reprising his role from Side Hustle
27	14	"Sorori-Tay-Tay"	Kim Fields	Angel Hobbs	February 23, 2023	216	0.10
Absent: Thomas Hobson as Bryce
28	15	"Beastie Pie"	Wendy Faraone	Emily Winter & William Luke Schreiber	March 2, 2023	214	0.13
29	16	"A Place to Lay Lay Your Head" "Bringing Down the House House"	Natalie Van Doren	Randi Barnes	March 9, 2023	215	0.10
Guest stars: Andrea Barber, Archer Vattano, Pyper Braun
30	17	"Bring It On"	Evelyn Belasco	Desia Gore	March 16, 2023	218	0.15
Guest stars: Andrea Barber, Marissa Reyes
31	18	"Lay Lay's Little Little"	Morenike Joela Evans	Sandra Oyeneyin	March 23, 2023	219	0.13
Guest stars: Anna-Grace Arnold, Archer Vattano, Graydon Yosowitz, Christine Rodriguez, Kaya Jackson
32	19	"Judge Lay Lay"	Leonard R. Garner Jr.	David A. Arnold	March 30, 2023	220	0.09
Guest stars: Anna-Grace Arnold, Sean Philip Glasgow, Archer Vattano, Graydon Yosowitz, Preston Garcia
33	20	"Lay Lay Gets Ready to Rumble Rumble"	Kim Fields	Freddie Gutierrez	April 6, 2023	222	0.16
Guest stars: Andrea Barber, Anna-Grace Arnold, Sean Philip Glasgow, Archer Vattano
34	21	"Ask Away-Way with Lay Lay"	Evelyn Belasco	Angel Hobbs	April 13, 2023	223	0.12
Guest stars: Ishmel Sahid, Anna-Grace Arnold, Sean Philip Glasgow, Archer Vattano, Graydon Yosowitz, Christine Rodriguez, Marissa Reyes Absent: Elijah M. Cooper as Cobo
35	22	"All I Want for Christmas Is Lay Lay"	Jody Margolin Hahn	Randi Barnes	December 20, 2023	221	0.06
Guest stars: Sean Philip Glasgow, Graydon Yosowitz
36	23	"Those Girls Lay Lay"	Leonard R. Garner Jr.	Desia Gore	February 19, 2024	224	0.06
Guest star: Ishmel Sahid
37	24	"Sooth-Sadie"	Morenike Joela Evans	Emily Winter & William Luke Schreiber	February 21, 2024	225	N/A
Guest stars: Ishmel Sahid, Kensington Tallman, Archer Vattano, Brandon Severs, Jay Brian Winnick
38	25	"Lay Lay Goes Away-Way"	Wendy Faraone	David A. Arnold	February 28, 2024	226	N/A
Guest stars: Andrea Barber, Ishmel Sahid, Archer Vattano, Miia Harris, Miguel A. Núñez Jr., Kelly Perine
39	26	"Out the App 2: E-Lay-Lay-tric Boogaloo"	Wendy Faraone	John D. Beck & Ron Hart	February 28, 2024	227	N/A
Guest stars: Miia Harris, Archer Vattano, Nicole Sullivan, Giselle Torres, Telci Huynh, Isabella Crovetti
40	27	"Granny Fae Fae's Back to Play Play"	Gwenn Victor	Mariah Rochelle Smith	March 6, 2024	228	N/A
Guest stars: Andrea Barber, Telma Hopkins, Lincoln Bonilla Absent: Elijah M. Cooper as Cobo
41	28	"School of Rap"	John D. Beck	Alice Gammill	March 6, 2024	229	N/A
Guest stars: Sara Rue, Kensington Tallman, Anna-Grace Arnold, Archer Vattano, Allisyn Snyder
42	29	"One Mo Bo"	Natalie Van Doren	Angel Hobbs	March 13, 2024	230	N/A
Guest stars: Archer Vattano, Christine Rodriguez, Charity Joy Harrison, Rena Strober, David Shatraw
43	30	"Adventures in Parent-Sitting"	Evelyn Belasco	Warren Hutcherson	March 13, 2024	231	N/A
Guest stars: Andrea Barber, Ishmel Sahid, Sean Philip Glasgow, Isa Eden, Innocent Ekakitie
44	31	"Powers to the People"	Jody Margolin Hahn	Sandra Oyeneyin	March 20, 2024	232	N/A
Guest stars: Andrea Barber, Ishmel Sahid, Anna-Grace Arnold, Archer Vattano, Jalen Youngblood
45	32	"Toothaches and CHOFMA Breaks"	Evelyn Belasco	Freddie Gutierrez	March 20, 2024	233	N/A
Guest stars: Billy Van Zandt, Kali Rocha

== Broadcast ==
The first season is available to stream on Netflix as of January 21, 2022. The series was added to Paramount+ on February 2, 2023. However, it was removed on March 28, 2024. The second season was added to Netflix on February 23, 2023.

== Reception ==
=== Critical response ===
Angelica Guarino of Common Sense Media gave the series a 4 out of 5 stars, stating that "technically, the show is sound: it has an engaging premise, a diverse cast, traditional sitcom conventions, and a bright and colorful set."

=== Ratings ===
Viewership and ratings per season of That Girl Lay Lay
Season	Episodes	First aired		Last aired		Avg. viewers (millions)
Season	Episodes	Date	Viewers (millions)	Date	Viewers (millions)	Avg. viewers (millions)
1	13	September 23, 2021	0.27	December 9, 2021	0.23	0.28
2	23	July 14, 2022	0.25	March 20, 2024	TBD	0.15

=== Awards and nominations ===
Year	Award	Category	Nominee(s)	Result	Refs
2022	NAACP Image Awards	Outstanding Performance by a Youth (Series, Special, Television Movie or Limited-series)	Alayah "Lay Lay" High	Nominated	
2022	Kids' Choice Awards	Favorite Kids TV Show	That Girl Lay Lay	Nominated	
2023	NAACP Image Awards	Outstanding Performance by a Youth (Series, Special, Television Movie or Limited-series)	Alaya High	Nominated	
2023	Kids' Choice Awards	Favorite Kids TV Show	That Girl Lay Lay	Nominated	
