= Snow Day (2022 film) =

2022 American musical comedy film

- Promotional release poster
- Directed by: Michael Lembeck
- Screenplay by: Samantha Martin; Chris Viscardi
- Based on: Snow Day by Will McRobb & Chris Viscardi
- Produced by: Zack Olin; Shauna Phelena; Ronald Gilbert
- Starring: Ky Baldwin; Michaela Russell; Fabi Aguirre; Shelby Simmons; Laura Bell Bundy; Rob Huebel; Jerry Trainor
- Cinematography: Thomas M. Harting
- Edited by: Tod Modisett
- Music by: Gabriel Mann
- Production companies: Nickelodeon Movies; Muse Entertainment
- Distributed by: Nickelodeon; Paramount+
- Release date: December 16, 2022
- Running time: 77 minutes
- Countries: United States; Canada
- Language: English

Snow Day is a 2022 musical comedy film directed by Michael Lembeck and written by Samantha Martin and Chris Viscardi. Produced by Nickelodeon Movies, the film is a remake of the 2000 film of the same name which Viscardi helped to conceive as it was originally developed as a follow-up to The Adventures of Pete & Pete before being rewritten as a standalone. Reimagined as a musical, it stars Ky Baldwin, Jerry Trainor, Rob Huebel, Laura Bell Bundy, Michaela Russell, Shelby Simmons, and Fabi Aguirre. It was released on Nickelodeon and Paramount+ on December 16, 2022. In June 2023, the film was removed from the service.

== Plot ==
Siblings Hal and Natalie discover that anything is possible when a surprise winter whiteout offers them the chance to break routines and take big risks. Hal decides to pursue his crush Claire while Natalie challenges the town's cranky snowplow man.

== Cast ==
- Fabi Aguirre as Lane
- Logan Aultman as Eli Welch
- Deena Aziz as Ms. Reynolds
- Ky Baldwin as Hal Brandston
- Lilly Noelle Bartlam as Missy
- Dave Campbell as Rebecca’s Dad
- Anastasia Dextrene as News Reporter Debra
- Myles Erlick as Chuck Wheeler
- Nir Guzinski as Mr. Brown
- Viggo Hanvelt as Randy Brandston
- Rob Huebel as Tom Brandston
- Laura Bell Bundy as Linda Brandston
- Morgan David Jones as Director
- Dominic Mariache as Wayne Castle
- Lisa McCormack as Miss Johnson
- Evelyne Morissette as Passerby
- Oliver Ocampo as Dirk
- Destiny Rettinger as Mason
- Michaela Russell as Natalie Brandston
- Shelby Simmons as Claire
- Melissa Toussaint as Nurse Johnson
- Jerry Trainor as Snowplow Man

== Production ==
On March 1, 2022, it was announced that Paramount+ had begun production on a musical remake of the 2000 Nickelodeon film Snow Day. The cast was unveiled alongside the announcement. Like the original film, it was shot primarily in Canadian territories despite being set in Syracuse, New York.

=== Soundtrack ===
The film's soundtrack was composed by Gabriel Mann. The soundtrack album was released alongside the film by Republic Records.

== Release ==
=== Marketing ===
A trailer was released on November 17, 2022, alongside the film's poster.

=== Release ===
Snow Day was made available to stream on Paramount+ on December 16, 2022. It also premiered on Nickelodeon the same day and was made available on international Paramount+ services the following day. In June 2023, the film was removed from Paramount+.

=== Reception ===
The film received mixed reviews from critics. John Serba of Decider gave the film a negative review, saying that "None of this slapdash also-ran cheapo crud is for anyone older than 10 or younger than nine and seven-eighths" and that "If a blizzard cancels school, have the kids watch something else." Joly Herman of Common Sense Media gave the film a 3/5, saying that "Viewers might wonder whether the theme of having a snow day is deserving of a full-length musical movie, but as soon as that thought enters the head, a fun dance number distracts, and some clever songs can elicit a smile."
