= Side Hustle =

American buddy comedy television series

- Genre: Buddy comedy
- Created by: Dave Malkoff
- Starring: Jules LeBlanc; Jayden Bartels; Isaiah Crews; Mitchell Berg; Jacques Chevelle
- Theme music composer: Joachim Svare; Joleen Belle; Jillian Allen
- Opening theme: "We Got This" by Jules LeBlanc and Jayden Bartels
- Composers: Niki Hexum; Zack Hexum
- Country of origin: United States
- Original language: English
- No. of seasons: 2
- No. of episodes: 46

Production
- Executive producers: Dave Malkoff; John D. Beck; Ron Hart
- Producers: Joe Sullivan; Chris Phillips
- Cinematography: Michael Franks
- Camera setup: Multi-camera
- Running time: 22 minutes
- Production companies: Eyebrow-Bird Productions; Nickelodeon Productions

Original release
- Network: Nickelodeon
- Release: November 7, 2020 – June 30, 2022

Side Hustle is an American buddy comedy television series created by Dave Malkoff that premiered on Nickelodeon on November 7, 2020. It lasted two seasons, with the final episode airing on June 30, 2022. The series stars Jules LeBlanc, Jayden Bartels, Isaiah Crews, Mitchell Berg, and Jacques Chevelle.

== Premise ==
In the town of Altoonisburg, smart and sarcastic Lex, tough and confident Presley, and their quirky male friend Munchy find themselves in a sticky situation after an accidental mishap destroys a boat belonging to Munchy's father, Principal Tedward. Forced to come up with creative ways to earn money to pay for the damages, the best friends enlist the help of Presley's tech-savvy younger brother, Fisher, to create an app called "Kid-DING" to connect with people looking for help with small jobs. With Munchy's bossy older brother Jaget making sure they keep up with the payments, the three friends must do any jobs that come their way no matter how crazy they are.

Halfway through season two, Presley manages to win a new boat for Tedward by winning a thumb wrestling competition allowing Tedward to call off Lex, Presley, and Munchy's debt to him. Unfortunately, they accidentally use their celebratory fireworks to destroy Jaget's new dune buggy, causing Jaget to take over Kid-DING so that they can pay for the damages to his dune buggy.

== Cast and characters ==
=== Main ===
- Jules LeBlanc as Lex, Presley's best friend who likes school and following the rules
- Jayden Bartels as Presley, Lex's best friend who is tough and confident
- Isaiah Crews as Munchy, Lex and Presley's quirky male friend
- Mitchell Berg as Fisher, Presley's younger brother who is a scientific genius and inventor, and has a crush on Lex
- Jacques Chevelle as Jaget, Munchy's conventional older brother who does not approve of Lex, Presley and Munchy, and is a crossing guard

=== Recurring ===
- Daryl C. Brown as Tedward, Munchy and Jaget's father and Lex and Presley's school principal who orders them to pay for the fire damage to his boat which lasts until "Thumb and Thumber"
- Kurt Ela as Alan, Presley and Fisher's quirky father
- Menik Gooneratne as Sophia Fugazi, a popular fashion blogger
- Matthew Sato as Spenders (season 1), the manager of Presley and Lex's favorite milkshake shop, MicroMooery
- Reyn Doi as Horrigan, Fisher's lab assistant
- Matte Martinez as Ty, Spenders' cousin who takes over running the Mooery when Spenders leaves town to open a new MicroMooery
- Leah Mei Gold as Gloria, an ardent student of Jaget's Jag-Jitsu martial arts class and Fisher's love interest
- Luke Mullen as Luke, Lex's love interest and an Altoonisburg student who wants to become a veterinarian

=== Notable guest stars ===
- Eric Allan Kramer as Briles, a man who works at the city dump
- Kensington Tallman as Ruby, Lex's visiting younger cousin, who develops a crush on Fisher
- Lilimar as Buckles, the owner of MicroMooery's competitor, Froyo-Yoyo
- Terry Crews as Nedward, Munchy's uncle and Tedward's brother
- Darci Lynne as The Wombat, a "fixer" who wears a tuxedo

== Production ==
On February 24, 2020, it was announced that Nickelodeon ordered Side Hustle from creator Dave Malkoff, a multi-camera buddy comedy series starring Annie LeBlanc as Lex and Jayden Bartels as Presley. Also starring in the series are Isaiah Crews – son of actor Terry Crews – as Munchy, Mitchell Berg as Fisher, and Jacques Chevelle as Jaget. Dave Malkoff serves as executive producer. John Beck and Ron Hart serve as executive producers and showrunners.

On January 7, 2021, it was announced that Nickelodeon had ordered seven more episodes of the series, bringing the first season order to 20 episodes. On March 18, 2021, it was announced that Nickelodeon had ordered six additional episodes of the series, bringing the revised first season order to 26 episodes. On September 1, 2021, it was announced that Nickelodeon renewed the series for a 20-episode second season. The second season premiered on October 2, 2021, and ended on June 30, 2022.

== Episodes ==
=== Series overview ===
Season	Episodes	Originally released	
Season	Episodes	First released	Last released
1	25	November 7, 2020	September 25, 2021
2	21	October 2, 2021	June 30, 2022

=== Season 1 (2020–21) ===
No. overall	No. in season	Title	Directed by	Written by	Original release date	Prod. code	U.S. viewers (millions)
1	1	"Start Hustling"	Adam Weissman	Dave Malkoff	November 7, 2020	101	0.36
Best friends Lex and Presley are relaxing after school when their friend, Munchy, comes over with fireworks he found confiscated by his father, Tedward, their school principal. They accidentally set off the fireworks which hit Tedward's boat, setting it on fire. Tedward requires that they pay him with money they earned through hard work. He puts them on a strict weekly payment schedule and tasks his son, Jaget, with keeping an eye on them. After days of unsuccessful job searching, they reach out to Presley's tech-savvy little brother, Fisher, who makes them an app called "KidDING" through which people can hire them. They get their first job as living mannequins at a clothing store where they are forced to pose all day in uncomfortable itchy wool suits. They try to escape by getting the store closed early but they are caught by the manager who threatens not to pay them. However, they threaten the manager with bad reviews, forcing him to pay them. Guest stars: Daryl C. Brown, Kurt Ela, Dominic Burgess, Menik Gooneratne
2	2	"Vitamin D-isaster"	Adam Weissman	Dave Malkoff	November 14, 2020	102	0.27
Lex, Presley and Munchy are hired as test subjects for a new vitamin that makes them unable to resist vegetables, with dizziness as a side effect. Fisher experiments on Munchy to find a cure while Lex and Presley take another job from Mrs. Castillo to be princesses for her daughter, Carina's birthday party. Unable to resist the vegetables in Mrs. Castillo's garden, Presley and Lex trick Carina and her friends into digging up the vegetables for them. After learning that the birthday cake has carrots in it, they steal it for themselves. Mrs. Castillo is disappointed in them and is about to fire them when Fisher arrives with a cure for Lex and Presley. The girls use a chemical that Fisher had accidentally discovered on Carina's parents to erase their memory from the last twenty-four hours. Carina blackmails Lex and Presley into giving her all the money they earned and forces them to return and work for free as princesses the following day. Guest stars: Kurt Ela, Carlos Acuña, Jennifer Carta, Juliana Restivo
3	3	"Yard Sale"	Adam Weissman	Dave Malkoff	November 21, 2020	103	0.38
Presley, Lex and Munchy need more money for their next boat payment but time is running out. They agree to do a yard sale but Lex says that she doesn't have anything she can sell. Presley challenges Lex by saying that she can find something Lex can sell. They find a dog toy but Lex says it's valuable. Convinced that Lex has a hard time letting go of things, Presley secretly sells the toy only to learn later that Lex keeps their KidDING money in it. When Tedward comes for the boat payment, Lex and Presley stall him while Jaget and Munchy search for the person who bought the dog toy. They eventually find the boy who bought it and he reveals that he was hired by Fisher to buy it since Fisher wanted to have something of Lex's but Presley won't let him. Guest stars: Kurt Ela, Daryl C. Brown
4	4	"Trashy Jobs"	Adam Weissman	Joe Sullivan	November 28, 2020	104	0.46
Lex's cousin, Ruby, is visiting and Lex has fun activities planned for them to do together. When Ruby meets Fisher, she immediately develops a crush on him. A KidDING comes in and Lex wants to turn it down in order to spend time with Ruby but Presley insists that they need the payment. The job is to find an antique zebra-striped toothbrush at the dump where they run into Briles, the trash guy. On returning home, they get another KidDING and Ruby insists they should take it. The job is to wash a trash compactor with the toothbrush, which makes Presley suspicious that Ruby is the one sending them these odd jobs at the dump so that she can be alone with Fisher. Suddenly, the compactor is locked and turned on. Luckily, Munchy is able to save them in time. They confirm that it was Ruby who hired Briles to trap them inside the compactor. Presley tricks Ruby into confessing by pretending that Lex got compressed with trash. Guest stars: Eric Allan Kramer, Kensington Tallman Absent: Jacques Chevelle as Jaget
5	5	"Friendiversary"	Leonard R. Garner Jr.	David A. Arnold	December 5, 2020	105	0.38
Every year, Lex and Presley celebrate Friendiversary, a made-up holiday for their friendship anniversary, by exchanging thoughtful gifts at the merry-go-round where they first met. Over the years, Friendiversary has become a competition over who can make the other cry the most with their gifts. This year, both girls are coincidentally planning to give each other a jar of their friendship tears. Unfortunately, there is a dangerous snowstorm, ruining their plans. Nevertheless, they push through it to go to the merry-go-round to prove their love for each other. Their friendship tears spill and freeze, causing their pants to be stuck to the merry-go-round during a blizzard. They send Munchy a signal to save them. After nearly freezing to death, Presley and Lex agree to stop using Friendiversary as a competition. Meanwhile, tired of going unnoticed by Lex, Fisher turns to Alan to help learn how to impress girls. Guest stars: Kurt Ela, David Alfano Absent: Jacques Chevelle as Jaget
6	6	"Milkshake Suckdown"	Leonard R. Garner Jr.	John D. Beck & Ron Hart	December 12, 2020	106	0.30
Presley, Lex and Munchy go to their favorite milkshake place, MicroMooery, where the owner, Spenders, is hosting a milkshake drinking competition. The winner gets a selfie with Cash the Cow and a year of free milkshakes. They join the contest and are determined to take down the reigning champion, Jaget. Presley asks Fisher to help Lex and Munchy build tolerance to brain freeze while she plays mind games on Jaget to throw him off his game. However, Jaget manipulates Munchy into feeling sad for him and losing on purpose. Lex loses too after getting a brain freeze because Fisher spared her from the experiments, afraid to hurt her. With her friends down, Presley is forced to join the contest at the last minute. She asks Lex and Munchy to distract Jaget while she suffers through the brain freeze to win the contest. Guest star: Matthew Sato
7	7	"KidDING! Dongs"	Jody Margolin Hahn	John D. Beck & Ron Hart	January 23, 2021	107	0.38
Lex and Presley have been training with Munchy for an upcoming Dance Dance Altoonisburg competition. They get a KidDING from Crunchy, a spoiled rich boy who used to be camp friends with Presley and Lex before they met Munchy. Crunchy offers to pay their entire boat debt if the girls agree to be his dance partners instead of Munchy's. When they ask Munchy about it, he gives them a confusing metaphor, making them think he is okay with it. Jaget convinces Munchy to form a new dance team with him and Fisher. Training with Crunchy becomes a nightmare because he bosses Lex and Presley around and refuses to practice with them. After learning that Munchy was hurt by their choice, Presley and Lex quit Crunchy's team and partner with Munchy again for the competition. Crunchy bribes the judge to win the contest but Principal Tedward refuses to give him the trophy and randomly gives it to Alan. Guest stars: Daryl C. Brown, Kurt Ela, Philip Solomon, Fred Grandy
8	8	"Lunch Boxed In"	Leonard R. Garner Jr.	Joe Sullivan	January 30, 2021	108	0.37
Presley and Lex find a map they made when they were five with clues to find a hidden lunchbox containing their friendship bracelets. While Lex is excited about the quest, Presley becomes nervous after remembering that instead of putting Lex's bracelet in the lunchbox, she had taken it with her to an arts camp where she accidentally baked it into a mug. Presley tries to keep Lex distracted all day while she and Alan work to recreate the bracelet. When Lex fails to question the fake bracelet, Presley is disappointed that Lex does not remember an important piece of their relationship. So, she comes clean to Lex, explaining that she had taken the bracelet to camp because she missed her. Lex understands and tells her that it is the memories that matter. Guest stars: Kurt Ela, Matthew Sato Absent: Jacques Chevelle as Jaget
9	9	"Chemistry Hustle"	Jody Margolin Hahn	Alex Hanpeter & Jude Tedmori	February 6, 2021	109	0.48
During Mr. Prusko's chemistry lessons, everyone usually falls asleep except Munchy. Principal Tedward threatens to reassign him if he cannot keep students awake. Lex and Presley make a deal with Prusko to help keep other students awake in exchange for good grades. They give him a makeover and take him to the Mooery to connect with students. They teach him a dance move but when it goes viral, Prusko lets his new popularity go to his head. He starts calling himself Mr. P and hires a DJ for his class. When he disrespects Munchy, Presley and Lex risk their grades by sabotaging Prusko's chemistry experiment to teach him a lesson. On seeing the mess caused, Tedward urges Prusko to go back to being boring for safety reasons. Meanwhile, Alan gives Fisher his leather jacket to impress girls and it seems to work on Lex but Fisher accidentally destroys it. Guest stars: Kurt Ela, Daryl C. Brown, David Theune, Matthew Sato Absent: Jacques Chevelle as Jaget
10	10	"Phantom of the Mooery"	Wendy Faraone	William Luke Schreiber and Beth Crudele	February 20, 2021	110	0.28
Spenders hires Presley, Lex and Munchy at the Mooery to find out who has been milking Cash the Cow at night and leaving the milk out to spoil. He has been stressed lately since Buckles opened a new competing store, FroYo Yo-Yo across the street and is determined to drive MicroMooery out of business. Lex suspects Buckles as the night milker but Presley suspects the ghost of Spenders' great-great grandfather. On their first night of stakeout, they panic and are unable to catch the night milker. They ask Spenders to give them another chance. On the second night, after realizing that Spenders sleeps upstairs from the Mooery, Munchy figures out that it is Spenders who has been milking the cow while sleepwalking due to stress over competing with Buckles. While working on the case, Presley asks Jaget to babysit Fisher but Fisher traps Jaget in a net to prove that he can take care of himself. Guest stars: Lilimar, Matthew Sato
11	11	"Karaoke Kickoff"	Wendy Faraone	Heather Wood & Maegan McConnell	February 27, 2021	111	0.35
Lex finds out that Presley and Munchy have bought a karaoke machine from their favorite local singing competition show, Karaoke Kickoff, where losing contestants are kicked off the stage with a giant foot. When the karaoke machine turns out to be defective, they go to the Karaoke Kickoff studio to confront the host, Rowan van Doren about it. He throws them into a basement where they find that past contestants have been making the karaoke machines since Van Doren promised he would let them back on the show if they make enough machines. Lex and Presley help the contestants realize that Van Doren has been lying to them. After exposing Van Doren during a live broadcast and kicking him off the stage, Presley and Lex perform a song together on stage. Meanwhile, Fisher fixes the broken karaoke machine and uses it with his father who has been trying to bond with him. Guest stars: Kurt Ela, Robert Belushi Absent: Jacques Chevelle as Jaget
12	12	"Dog Wed-DING!"	David Kendall	David A. Arnold	March 13, 2021	112	0.31
Lex's favorite internet dogs, Lulu and Poochie-Boy are getting married, and she wants the dog owners to hire her and Presley as wedding planners. She convinces them by tagging them in dozens of photos of a fake wedding for her dog, Reggie. Presley and Lex set up a meeting with the dog owners at the Mooery while Munchy trains to be a dog wedding officiator. Walking the dogs, Presley discovers that Lulu is in love with Lex's dog instead of the dog she's supposed to marry. Presley tells Lex about it but Lex doesn't believe her. So, she turns to Fisher to build her an app that can translate dog barks into words. Presley stops the wedding and uses the app to prove to Lex and the dog owners that Lulu doesn't want to marry Poochie-Boy. Guest stars: Ben Begley, Renee Dorian, Matthew Sato, Paul Vogt Absent: Jacques Chevelle as Jaget
13	13	"Uncle Nedward"	Wendy Faraone	Dave Malkoff	March 20, 2021	113	0.47
Lex and Presley are hired by Spenders to create a poster for the Mooery for Hawk Day, a holiday celebrating the town's favorite bird, Hudson the Hawk. Munchy's charismatic motivator uncle, Nedward, who is watching over him for the weekend motivates them to paint a realistic mural of Hudson's nest. Unfortunately, Hudson hits the mural and gets hurt after mistaking it for the actual nest. Lex, Presley and Munchy feel guilty for putting the hawk in the hospital, leaving its eggs unattended at the top of the highest cliff in Altoonisburg. After encouragement to fix the problem by Nedward, Munchy climbs to the top of the cliff to rescue the eggs but panics because he is afraid of heights. Lex and Presley motivate Nedward to overcome his own fear of heights and save his nephew using indestructible bubble suits that Fisher had built for Jaget. Guest stars: Terry Crews, Daryl C. Brown, Matthew Sato
14	14	"Jag-Jitsu"	Leonard R. Garner Jr.	David A. Arnold	March 27, 2021	115	0.35
Jaget starts a self-defense class called Jag-Jitsu but no one wants to sign up. Feeling bad for him, Tedward sends Presley, Lex and Munchy a KidDING, forcing them to join and put up with Jaget's horrible teaching methods. Jaget's rival, Crash the bus driver, comes over to make fun of him during a lesson. Jaget says that he started Jag-Jitsu after Crash enlisted a group of bad kids in her dojo to terrorize his crosswalks. Unable to put up with Jaget, the gang quits his class but they later feel guilty and rejoin the class to help him defeat Crash's dojo. Meanwhile, Alan tries to befriend Tedward by pretending that he can play chess. He asks Fisher to teach him how to play but when that doesn't work, they agree to cheat. Guest stars: Kurt Ela, Daryl C. Brown, Christina Calph
15	15	"Hot Tubby's"	David Kendall	Joe Sullivan	April 3, 2021	116	0.29
Presley, Lex and Munchy are hired to produce a commercial for a hot tub store contest where people can win a hot tub by correctly guessing the number of ping pong balls in a tub. Tubby, the store owner, and his son want to star in the commercial but can't act. So, the gang creates the best commercial with what they have but Tubby refuses to pay them. For payback, they break into the store to count the balls, but overhear Tubby telling his niece the correct number to cheat in the contest. Lex, Presley and Munchy remove one ball from the tub, ruining Tubby's plans. They submit their guesses using the new correct number, and win three hot tubs for orphans against Tubby's wish. Meanwhile, Fisher is building a Rube Goldberg machine but doesn't want his father tripping over it like he did the previous year. So, he hires an assistant to keep an eye on Alan. Guest stars: Kurt Ela, Reyn Doi, Michael Dunn Absent: Jacques Chevelle as Jaget
16	16	"Moo's the Boss"	Evelyn Belasco	John D. Beck & Ron Hart	April 10, 2021	114	0.39
Spenders leaves town to open a new MicroMooery and asks his cousin, Ty to take over running the Mooery in Altoonisburg. Ty wants to close for the weekend while undergoing employee training but Lex, Presley and Munchy convince him to hire them to keep the Mooery open. They fantasize about how fun running the Mooery will be, but it turns out to be quite challenging. Munchy creates his fantasy shake, the "blowgurt" but it ends up being too sticky. Lex and Presley lose customers because they can't find the milk. After realizing that the milk is in a vat, they accidentally cause its pressure to build up. The vat starts squirting milk, forcing them to use their hands and feet, before eventually using Munchy's blowgurt to block the holes. The pressure continues to build and the vat explodes, covering them with milk. Instead of paying them, Ty uses their paychecks to repair the damages they caused. Guest stars: Matte Martinez, Matthew Sato Absent: Jacques Chevelle as Jaget
17	17	"Make-a-Mutt"	Jody Margolin Hahn	Maegan McConnell & Heather Wood	April 17, 2021	118	0.38
Lex is excited to get a KidDING from her favorite stuffed animal store, Make-A-Mutt where children customize their dogs and a "magical" machine builds them. She is disappointed to learn that the dogs are actually built by a person, Marilyn, in the back room. She, Presley and Munchy are hired to take over while Marilyn is out of town. To help get more customers by advertising Make-A-Mutt all over town. The orders start coming in too fast for Lex and Presley to keep up. This causes them to build some of the dogs incorrectly, upsetting the children. Luckily, Marilyn returns early and resumes the job. Meanwhile, when Fisher accidentally destroys the garage door with a lawnmower, Munchy tells him to call a fixer known as the Wombat. Instead of helping Fisher fix the garage, the Wombat keeps making demands until Fisher realizes that he should have just told the truth. The Wombat congratulates him for reaching that conclusion. Guest stars: Kurt Ela, Darci Lynne, Jack Plotnick, Juliana Restivo Absent: Jacques Chevelle as Jaget
18	18	"Juckles"	Mike Caron	Dave Malkoff	May 1, 2021	119	0.38
Lex, Presley and Munchy are at the Mooery when Jaget comes in demanding boat payment money, which they don't have. Micromooery's competitor, Buckles comes in to taunt Ty with a mean singing telegram. After bonding over how mean they are, Jaget and Buckles go out on a date. Presley, Lex and Munchy realize that as long as Jaget is with Buckles, he is less mean to them. Unfortunately, Buckles tells them that she wants to break up with Jaget. To keep Jaget and Buckles together, they teach Jaget to be nice and give him a makeover to make him more appealing but Buckles is not impressed. Meanwhile, Fisher has been working on a mechanical bull that Tedward bought by accident. Since Buckles said she likes cowboys, Lex, Presley and Munchy convince Jaget to ride the mechanical bull to impress Buckles. Later, Buckles tells Jaget that she liked him for being mean. So, they agree to stay together and embrace being mean to people. Guest stars: Daryl C. Brown, Lilimar, Matte Martinez, Carmen Sanchez
19	19	"Rat Busters"	Adam Weissman	John D. Beck & Ron Hart	May 8, 2021	120	0.34
A fancy French restaurant hires Presley, Lex and Munchy to get rid of a rat without being seen by customers. Since Presley is scared of rats, she wants to kill it but Lex wants to catch it and release it to a safe place. The rat lands on Presley's shoulder but she throws it away, and they are unable to catch it. Fisher builds them air cannons to blow and trap the rat but they accidentally trap a napkin instead. So, they are forced to go back during the mayor's birthday dinner. Munchy distracts the mayor and her guests by making them a fancy salad while Presley and Lex try to catch the rat. In the process, the girls destroy almost everything inside the restaurant before catching the rat. The restaurant owner doesn't want to pay them but the mayor forces her. They give the rat to Briles who has been looking for a new pet. Guest stars: Eric Allan Kramer, Rena Strober Absent: Jacques Chevelle as Jaget
20	20	"Bot Club"	Natalie Van Doren	Joe Sullivan	May 15, 2021	121	0.30
Fisher is involved in an underground robot fight club that meets in the MicroMooery basement. His robot, Tyrannosaurus Lex, has been winning for weeks and he is confident he can beat his science rival, Tasha. After finding out about it, Presley, Lex and Munchy bet their recently-earned KidDING money on Fisher's bot. Unfortunately, Tasha's robot, Trainwreck, destroys Fisher's bot in an instant. Fisher's soul is crushed. Presley bets the entire KidDING business on Fisher's ability to build another robot that can defeat Trainwreck. Fisher has given up on science but Presley tricks him by pretending to build a robot badly since she knows Fisher can't resist fixing it. This works and inspires Fisher to build a robot with a spatula that defeats Tasha's Trainwreck by flipping it. Meanwhile, when Alan's garden gnome that looks like him goes missing, he enlists Jaget's help to find the thief. Guest stars: Kurt Ela, Matte Martinez, William Ludwig
21	21	"Extra Crunchy"	Evelyn Belasco	Alex Hanpeter & Jude Tedmori	May 22, 2021	122	0.29
Munchy is practicing for a halftime stunt to help him become the school mascot, Luna the Tuna. Crunchy transfers to Altoonishburg and starts acting extremely nice to everyone, making Presley suspicious that he is up to something. His butler invites Lex and Presley to a secret meeting where he reveals that Crunchy intends to sabotage Munchy's mascot stunt by putting itchy bite mites in the mascot costume. They run to the game to warn Munchy but it's too late. To help Munchy complete the stunt, they lead the crowd to cheer since the bite mites get knocked unconscious by noise. With his plot exposed, Crunchy is expelled from the school. Meanwhile, when Fisher's latest experiment attracts government agents to the house, Alan grounds him from doing anything science-related. Fisher sneaks out with science equipment disguised as a grill to keep experimenting, but when he accidentally makes a basketball, he decides to play instead. Guest stars: Daryl C. Brown, Kurt Ela, Matte Martinez, Reyn Doi, Philip Solomon, Hal Landon, Jr, Arnie Pantoja Absent: Jacques Chevelle as Jaget
22	22	"Mouth Noise"	Wendy Faraone	Alex Hanpeter & Jude Tedmori	July 17, 2021	117	0.23
When Munchy inadvertently creates an addictive catchy tune with his mouth noise, Presley and Lex are unable to get it out of their heads. The trio is hired as security guards at a music store where they run into Jaget and Fisher. They grab instruments and start playing the melody, adding lyrics to it. This inspires them to start a band called Mouth Noise. The song's popularity gets them hired to play at MicroMooery but they break up before the performance due to creative differences. Following the break up, Lex and Presley want to pursue solo careers but they end up missing each other. Meanwhile, Alan mistakes their tune for another song and enlists Tedward to help him figure out what song it is. Using a music recognition app, they identify the song as "I'm Gonna Be (500 Miles)". They are asked to perform it at the Mooery since Mouth Noise cancelled. Encouraged by chants from the crowd, Mouth Noise agrees to get back together and perform their song. Guest stars: Daryl C. Brown, Kurt Ela, David Lengel
23	23	"Love Sensei"	Wendy Faraone	Maegan McConnell & Heather Wood	September 11, 2021	123	0.36
Fisher asks Lex to accompany him to a science awards dinner but she declines to avoid giving him the wrong idea. Jaget volunteers himself and his Jag-Jitsu student, Gloria, to help Fisher impress Lex. They follow Lex, Presley and Munchy to the Snow Cone Festival and hatch a plan for Gloria to pretend to steal Lex's snow cone and have Fisher save the day. However, the plan fails and Lex loses her dog, Reggie, in the chaos. Feeling guilty, Fisher invents a machine to attract dogs but it malfunctions and attracts bees instead. After Presley and Munchy find the dog, Lex thanks Fisher for his help and agrees to go to the dinner with him but Fisher says he does not deserve it because he is the reason Reggie got lost in the first place. Gloria offers to go with Fisher instead. Guest stars: Matte Martinez, Leah Mei Gold
24	24	"Room for Munchy"	Adam Weissman	John D. Beck & Ron Hart	September 18, 2021	125	0.29
The gang is unable to hangout at Presley's basement because Alan is impulsively fixing things around the house. Since Lex's house is crowded, they want to use Munchy's but Munchy keeps coming up with excuses. Lex and Presley learn that Munchy shares a room with Jaget even though Jaget has his own room he uses as a dojo for Jag-Jitsu. When Jaget refuses to let Munchy have his own room, the girls convince Munchy to trick Jaget by starting a fake dojo but the plan backfires. They then invite Jaget's favorite martial arts movie star, Clint Kickwood, who helps him open up. Jaget reveals that he shares a room with Munchy because when they were little, Munchy made him promise to never leave him. Meanwhile, Alan's repairs end up destroying the house and they're all forced to sleep in Munchy and Jaget's room for a while. Guest stars: Daryl C. Brown, Kurt Ela, The Miz
25	25	"The Presley Slide"	Adam Weissman	Dave Malkoff	September 25, 2021	126	0.39
Presley, Lex and Munchy are hired as backup dancers for ZooZoo's music video. Presley is excited to show her a new dance move she invented called "the Presley Slide". When ZooZoo is unable to do the dance, Presley is asked to be her stand-in since no one would see her face. The dance move goes viral but ZooZoo takes credit for it. Alan encourages Presley to sue ZooZoo and volunteers to be her lawyer. However, their case falls apart because the judge is an openly biased fan of ZooZoo, and ZooZoo fakes an injury to avoid being asked to do the dance. While filming a crosswalk instructions video, Jaget, Fisher and Gloria catch ZooZoo on camera walking and talking on the phone about how she stole Presley's dance and calling the judge stupid. The video helps Presley win the case. Guest stars: Kurt Ela, Daryl C. Brown, Ashley Fuss, Leah Mei Gold, Matte Martinez, Eddie Perino, Lise Simms

=== Season 2 (2021–22) ===
No. overall	No. in season	Title	Directed by	Written by	Original release date	Prod. code	U.S. viewers (millions)
26	1	"Model Employee"	Adam Weissman	Dave Malkoff	October 2, 2021	201	0.27
Lex is about to buy some hard-to-get tickets to a fashion show when Presley announces that they have been hired as runway models for the show. However, it turns out that they were hired by a store called Runway Models to help little children make airplane models. Lex is upset with Presley for not reading the instructions and causing them to lose their tickets. They start fighting and accidentally glue their hands together. After getting a KidDING from the real fashion show, they ask Munchy to stall while they try to unglue themselves. However, they end up stuck to a model of bridge. After making up with Presley, Lex uses her accessorizing skills to make it look like a fashion statement commemorating the Altoonisburg bridge. Meanwhile, Alan paves his driveway to impress Tedward but panics when a caution sign gets stuck in the cement. Guest stars: Daryl C. Brown, Kurt Ela, Menik Gooneratne
27	2	"Wreck-It Rex"	Adam Weissman	John D. Beck & Ron Hart	October 9, 2021	202	0.32
When Lex accidentally destroys her little brother Rex's toy truck, Rex threatens to smash a friendship hourglass containing sand from the first sandcastle that Lex and Presley made together. To save their hourglass, Lex must win another truck for Rex from Shady Pete's Carnival before the sand runs out. She tries many times without success and wants to give up but Presley encourages her to train and keep trying. Presley later discovers that Pete is using a remote to rig the game. She seizes it, allowing Lex to win, just before the time runs out. Meanwhile, Fisher and Horrigan ask for Munchy's help while experimenting on a machine that can transform the DNA of any living thing into another organism. After leaving him alone and finding a butterfly instead, they become convinced that their machine has turned Munchy into a butterfly. Guest stars: Kurt Ela, Daryl C. Brown, Reyn Doi, Curt Mega, Jack Stanton Absent: Jacques Chevelle as Jaget
28	3	"The Way You Luke Tonight"	Jody Margolin Hahn	Joe Sullivan	October 16, 2021	203	0.22
A popular girl named Tabitha hires Presley, Lex and Munchy to plan a dance proposal for Luke to ask her out in order to get her ex-boyfriend, Perry, jealous. They are unable to come up with good proposal ideas because Luke and Tabitha have nothing in common. However, Presley and Munchy notice that Lex and Luke have a lot in common and like each other. They change the proposal behind Lex's back and use it to help Luke ask Lex to the dance instead. Tabitha becomes furious at them for ruining her chance to make Perry jealous but Perry reveals that he wanted to make her jealous too. Meanwhile, Jaget convinces Fisher to build him a drone to help him fly. Impatient with testing, Jaget flies away but falls in the middle of Perry's proposal to Tabitha, which impresses her enough to pay for the KidDING job. Guest stars: Daryl C. Brown, Noah Beck, Arica Himmel, Matte Martinez, Luke Mullen
29	4	"Scare Bear"	Wendy Faraone	Wesley Jermaine Johnson & Scott Taylor	October 23, 2021	124	0.24
Guest stars: Kurt Ela, Reyn Doi, Matte Martinez
30	5	"Al-Dude-isburg"	Wendy Faraone	Laura House	October 30, 2021	204	0.26
After learning that their favorite celebrity chef, Dude Calzone, is coming to Altoonisburg for a food contest, Presley and Lex convince Munchy to enter his secret family recipe stew. However, during the contest, they are shocked to learn that Dude's sister requires every contestant to share their recipe as part of the contract. Dude is unable to help them because he is bound by contracts as well. To stop her from stealing Munchy's recipe, they make another stew with a very hot lava pepper. When Dude's sister tastes it and starts begging for milk, they force her to release everyone from their contracts first. Dude crowns Munchy as the winner for the best stew. Meanwhile, Alan offers to teach Fisher how to cook but Fisher thinks he can make the perfect casserole using science. Guest stars: Kurt Ela, Ryan W. Garcia, Matte Martinez, Erika Soto
31	6	"Stash the Cash"	Leonard R. Garner Jr.	Wesley Jermaine Johnson & Scott Taylor	November 6, 2021	205	0.36
In an attempt to run MicroMooery out of business, Buckles files a complaint to have Cash the Cow taken away. To save Cash and the Mooery, Lex and Ty sneak and hide the cow in Presley's garage. Buckles offers to get back with Jaget if he helps her track down the cow. When Jaget comes over and notices the cow, they panic and lock him in the garage with the cow and Lex, who had been knocked down while trying to hide Cash. Lex asks Jaget to calm down but Jaget assumes that it is the cow talking to him. Lex takes advantage of this to form a bond between Jaget and Cash. When Buckles forces Jaget to choose between her and the cow, Jaget chooses Cash and convinces his city officer friend to give Ty the permit the Mooery needs to keep the cow. Guest stars: Lilimar, David Magidoff, Reyn Doi, Matte Martinez
32	7	"Lex-Jitsu"	Leonard R. Garner Jr.	Laura House	November 13, 2021	206	0.24
Lex has been too busy lately to spend time with Presley and Munchy. Any free time she has gets consumed by Fisher asking her out or Gloria sneak-attacking her. Gloria explains that in order to earn her next Jag-Jitsu belt, Jaget wants her to defeat Lex since Lex defeated her at the Snow Cone Festival. Presley and Munchy unsuccessfully try to set up Gloria with Fisher to keep them away from Lex. When Lex goes to talk to Jaget about Gloria, she accidentally challenges and defeats him for the sensei title. Despite not wanting it initially, Lex gets tempted by the sensei power and renames Jag-Jitsu into "Lex-Jitsu". She starts making members like Gloria do some of her tasks. To get Lex back, Presley and Munchy use her weaknesses to help Gloria defeat her in battle. Gloria later allows Jaget to win the sensei title back. Guest star: Leah Mei Gold
33	8	"A Mouth Noise Christmas"	Evelyn Belasco	Alex Hanpeter & Jude Tedmori	November 20, 2021	207	0.25
Stump, a rich fan of Mouth Noise, offers to donate robots to children if the band performs a Christmas concert at the Mooery. Lex and Presley reach out to Munchy, Fisher and Jaget to reunite Mouth Noise. However, they are blocked from performing by the Altoonisburg mayor and S.H.H.H., a group of people with sensitive hearing who pushed for a law blocking loud noises. Meanwhile, while searching through the Altoonisburg Dump for copies of an old video game, Alan and Tedward learn from Briles that Altoonisburg laws don't apply at the dumpster because it is not part of any town. After hearing this, Mouth Noise decides to hold the concert at the dumpster instead. The S.H.H.H. people try to block it unsuccessfully. Mouth Noise proceeds with the concert at the dump by giving ear muffs to people with sensitive ears. Guest stars: Daryl C. Brown, Kurt Ela, Jared Gertner, Eric Allan Kramer, Matte Martinez
34	9	"Return of Uncle Nedward"	Phill Lewis	Wesley Jermaine Johnson & Scott Taylor	March 10, 2022	212	0.26
Lex, Presley and Munchy learn that a powerful CEO, Roxie Rockhart, wants to demolish Ol' Cliffy, the highest cliff in Altoonsiburg, to build an indoor rock climbing park. They go to warn Munchy's Uncle Nedward who has been nesting baby hawks at the cliff since Hawk Day. They convince him to use his motivational skills to mobilize others to protest against Roxie but she manages to win people over. Unable to get anyone else on their side, Lex and Presley try to bribe the construction workers while Munchy and Nedward protest by sitting on a wrecking ball together. Lex and Presley hijack Roxie's cliff demolition livestream with a song that eventually wins people over to protest and save the cliff. Meanwhile, after getting sprayed by a skunk, Alan and Jaget seek Fisher's help to clear the smell but he accidentally removes their eyebrows and turns them green. Guest stars: Terry Crews, Kurt Ela, Maria Canals-Barrera, Ryan W. Garcia
35	10	"Room4U"	Evelyn Belasco	Laura House	March 17, 2022	211	0.24
When Presley is left in charge for the weekend while Alan is at a gnome convention, she rents out Fisher's room without his knowledge to Don Cucco. Fisher gets revenge by reposting the listing and booking a lot of people, including Tabitha and Bardo. Lex and Presley struggle to meet the guests' demands. When Alan says that he is coming home early, Lex convinces Presley to apologize to Fisher so that he can help get rid of the guests. Fisher refuses but changes his mind after being caught in the middle of a fight between Tabitha and Don Cucco. Meanwhile, Munchy goes to the Mooery where Ty shows him a cup of coffee with a foam in the shape of a swan. Munchy accidentally sneezes on it, causing it to look like Dwayne Johnson, which attracts a lot of people to the Mooery, including local news. Guest stars: Kurt Ela, Arica Himmel, William Ludwig, Matte Martinez, Paul Vogt Absent: Jacques Chevelle as Jaget
36	11	"Clownderella"	Chris Phillips	John D. Beck & Ron Hart	March 24, 2022	209	0.34
Munchy bonds with a clown girl at the Mooery but she has to go abruptly, accidentally leaving one shoe behind. He enlists Presley and Lex's help to find the girl who fits the shoe, despite Lex's fear of clowns. After a lot of searching, they learn about a clowns-only café called Scoochy's. They go there undercover as clowns but they are forced to prove they are real clowns. They win over the clowns by making them laugh but are exposed because of their costumes. Days later, Munchy is about to lose hope when a girl named Clara comes to claim the shoe and proves that she was the clown girl. Meanwhile, Fisher builds a talking assistant into the fridge to distract Alan from interrupting his experiments. However, he becomes jealous that his father is spending more time bonding with the fridge than with him. Guest stars: Kurt Ela, Jeffrey Nicholas Brown, Reyn Doi, Grace Lu Absent: Jacques Chevelle as Jaget
37	12	"That Young Warped Danger Hustle" "When Worlds Collide"	Adam Weissman	Dave Malkoff	April 21, 2022	220	0.25
During the AltooniCon comic convention, Lex, Presley and Munchy are hired by Ruby and Milo to run the Warped! comic store booth. While unpacking a box from Danger Force, Ruby finds an orb which can be used to control people. She assumes it's a replica but Danger Force had actually shipped it by mistake. The gang unknowingly sells the orb to Sadie and Lay Lay just before getting a call from Danger Force to warn them that the supervillain Frankini is after the orb and intends to use it to turn people into his backup dancers. They try to get the orb back but Frankini bests them and takes it. As Frankini starts turning people into backup dancers, Ruby suggests covering their ears to avoid being controlled. Since music can block the orb's signals, Lex, Presley, Sadie and Lay Lay perform a song to release people from Frankini's control but he gets the orb back and controls them as well. Danger Force arrives just in time to save the day with their superpowers. Later, they all celebrate together at the Mooery. Special guest stars: Young Dylan, Havan Flores, Terrence Little Gardenhigh, Kate Godfrey, Gabrielle Nevaeh Green, Dana Heath, That Girl Lay Lay, Luca Luhan, Anton Starkman Guest stars: Kurt Ela, Frankie Grande, Reyn Doi, Matte Martinez
38	13	"Flex to the Future"	Natalie Van Doren	Wesley Jermaine Johnson and Scott Taylor	April 28, 2022	218	0.15
Jaget has tickets to an exclusive red carpet movie premiere and invites Lex, Presley, Munchy, Fisher and Ty as his entourage. Lex and Presley argue after accidentally wearing the same outfit. They try competing to determine who should wear it but they tie every single time. Alan later settles the argument by reminding them how happy they were the first time they matched outfits before they started minding what other people think. Before the premiere, Ty asks for Munchy's help to get rid of an extremely slow customer. When Fisher's snake swallows Jaget's phone with the tickets, they're forced to bring the snake to the premiere but it starts choking Jaget on the red carpet. In the commotion, Munchy is busted for sneaking snacks, causing Jaget and his entourage to be barred. Luckily, the movie's star, Bruno Bicep, helps them get in. Guest stars: Big E, Kurt Ela, Matte Martinez, Fred Stoller
39	14	"Thumb and Thumber"	David Kendall	Beth Crudele	May 5, 2022	213	0.23
Tedward asks Presley to compete in a thumb wrestling tournament to win him a boat so that the gang will no longer need to pay him for blowing his boat. Presley used to be a thumb wrestling champion known as Thumbderstorm but stopped competing after a painful loss to her rival, Rago. She trains Munchy to compete instead but Rago breaks Munchy's thumb before the competition. This forces Presley to compete after all. After discovering that Rago's mother has been helping him cheat by kissing his thumb with grease, Lex and Munchy hide the grease, which allows Presley to fairly beat Rago and win the boat. To celebrate, the gang opens fireworks again and accidentally blow up an expensive dune buggy that Jaget had received from ZooZoo for saving her. Jaget tells them that, going forward, they will be working for him until they fully pay for destroying his dune buggy. Guest stars: Daryl C. Brown, Ashley Fuss, Jackson Jones, Matte Martinez, Jill Matson-Sachoff
40	15	"Groomer Has It"	David Kendall	Michael Cadwallader	May 12, 2022	214	0.21
Lex, Presley and Munchy are forced by Jaget to take a KidDING job at Groomer Has It store for destroying his dune buggy. Lex had been avoiding the store because Luke works there and never texted her after their dance together. When Sophia Fugazi asks them to wash her dogs, Presley and Munchy take one to another room, allowing Lex and Luke to talk. After a lot of awkwardness with Lex unconvincingly trying to act "chill", Luke tells Lex that he still likes her but has been too busy with work. Meanwhile, unable to choose one shampoo, Presley mixes all the bottles and ends up filling the entire room with bubbles. Since one of the bottles was a pink dog dye, the dog fur turns pink. To make it look intentional, Lex and Luke dye their dog light blue and convince Sophia that it is a fashion statement as cotton candy dogs. Guest stars: Kurt Ela, Daryl C. Brown, Menik Gooneratne, Luke Mullen
41	16	"Sand Storm"	Evelyn Belasco	Dave Malkoff	May 19, 2022	208	0.21
Concerned that Presley is not taking the sandcastle building competition seriously, Lex partners with Fisher. Due to miscommunication, Presley doesn't understand that she has been replaced until the day of the contest. She partners with Munchy at the last minute while Lex and Fisher build a magnificent sand sculpture of the Altoonisburg Space Needle. When the space needle is destroyed, Lex accuses Presley of sabotaging it but they later find out that it was destroyed by Horrigan to punish Fisher for choosing Lex over him. They all forgive each other and join forces to rebuild the space needle but they are disqualified for having too many people. Their rivals, the Jerklevoss twins, win but Lex snatches away their prize. Elsewhere, while helping Ty at the Mooery, Jaget starts doing an insult comedy routine. However, when Sophia Fugazi plays along and insults him back, Jaget starts crying and quits. Guest stars: Reyn Doi, Menik Gooneratne, Elise Luthman, Joey Luthman, Matte Martinez
42	17	"Dinner for Jerks"	Evelyn Belasco	Alex Hanpeter & Jude Tedmori	May 26, 2022	215	0.24
After gaining access to the KidDING app, Jaget forces the trio to take a KidDING job they had turned down from Crunchy, their obsessive enemy. Crunchy forces Lex, Presley and Munchy to become his butlers and serve a revenge dinner where he has invited mean guests who have had bad experiences with the trio. Among the guests are: Tabitha for almost ruining her dance proposal; Big Tubby for making him give hot tubs to orphans; the Jerklevoss twins for stealing their sandcastle prize; and Jaget for destroying his dune buggy. Since Jaget won't let them quit, the gang gets Crunchy to fire them by destroying his priceless table while pretending to do the butler dance. Meanwhile, Fisher competes with Gloria in a periodic table game he invented but Gloria keeps beating him, even after asking Horrigan to help him cheat. Gloria later confesses that she was cheating too. Guest stars: Tacey Adams, Reyn Doi, Michael Dunn, Leah Mei Gold, Arica Himmel, Elise Luthman, Joey Luthman, Philip Solomon
43	18	"Prank You Very Much"	Adam Weissman	Joe Sullivan	June 9, 2022	219	0.28
Jaget launches a Jag-Jitsu power shakes business and starts pranking Ty to drive MicroMooery out of business. He hires Presley, Lex and Munchy to unknowingly deliver a package that explodes in Ty's face. Feeling guilty for helping Jaget prank their friend, the gang decides to get revenge, despite Ty's advice to let it blow over. They come up with a prank to fly away Jaget's blender bike using one of Fisher's drones. However, a miscommunication causes them to fly Munchy along with the bike to the top of the Altoonisburg Space Needle. When the drone accidentally crashes, Lex and Presley ask Ty to help them rescue Munchy using his hot air balloon. Ty thanks them for going through all that trouble for him. When Jaget comes looking for his bike, the gang flies him to the space needle and where he stays for a while. Guest stars: Kurt Ela, Matte Martinez
44	19	"Altoonisburg Al"	Adam Weissman	Dave Malkoff	June 16, 2022	216	0.26
There is a popular possum known as Altoonisburg Al who comes out on Possum Day. The Mayor announces that if Al chooses a bowl of strawberries, she would add six more weeks of summer, but if he chooses blueberries, they would go back to school early. Unlike everyone else, Lex wants to go back to school early so that her classmates can wish her a happy birthday. During the Possum festival, while Munchy works at a booth to make possum juice, Presley and Lex accidentally let Al get away. Presley hides in the tree and, using her Altoonisburg Al puppet to fool people, she chooses blueberries for Lex. When Presley is busted, the mayor compromises by adding three weeks of summer. Meanwhile, when Horrigan gets stuck in Fisher's wall bed during an experiment, Fisher tries to get him out using science but Gloria wins by using Jag-Jitsu to kick the bed back out. Guest stars: Reyn Doi, Leah Mei Gold, Luke Mullen
45	20	"We Have a Bingo!"	Natalie Van Doren	Joe Sullivan	June 23, 2022	210	0.20
Presley's grandmother, Gladys, asks Presley and Lex to be substitute callers for bingo night. Gladys and her childhood best friend, Ethel, are an inspiration and Lex and Presley's friendship. Presley mistakes a "6" for a "9", making Ethel think that she won, only to reveal that it was actually Gladys who won. This ignites a fight between Ethel and Gladys. Scared that their own friendship could end like this, Presley and Lex try to get Gladys and Ethel back together by reminding them what they like about each other. This fails and results in a fight at the Mooery. The girls eventually get Gladys and Ethel to mend their friendship by tricking them into teaming up against a common enemy – Jaget – who easily takes the bait and starts insulting them during Bingoff. Meanwhile, Fisher volunteers to fix Rex's toy truck in order to use Rex to learn more about Lex. Guest stars: Teresa Ganzel, Angel Harper, Jack Stanton
46	21	"Yesley Day"	Jody Margolin Hahn	John D. Beck & Ron Hart	June 30, 2022	217	0.30
Looking for some adventures, Presley declares "Yesley Day", a day in which Lex, Munchy and Fisher have to say yes to everything she asks to honor an old birthday coupon they had given her. When Jaget forces them to make a thousand hand turkeys, Fisher keeps him distracted by tricking him into playing an endless game, while the rest sneak out of the house. After going to the Mooery and agreeing to eat a giant ice-cream, the trio visits Coaster World to go on the newest roller coaster ride, the Grim Weeper. Despite being warned that the ride has not been tested, they insist on riding, but the coaster car gets stuck upside down at the top of the loop. After panicking for a while, they use an exploding soda bottle to get it moving. They head back home and quickly complete the job before Jaget finds out. Guest stars: Reyn Doi, Matte Martinez, Luke Mullen, Kelly Perine

== Ratings ==
Viewership and ratings per season of Side Hustle
Season	Episodes	First aired		Last aired		Avg. viewers (millions)
Season	Episodes	Date	Viewers (millions)	Date	Viewers (millions)	Avg. viewers (millions)
1	25	November 7, 2020	0.36	September 25, 2021	0.39	0.35
2	21	October 2, 2021	0.27	June 30, 2022	0.30	0.25
