= Band from TV =

American band

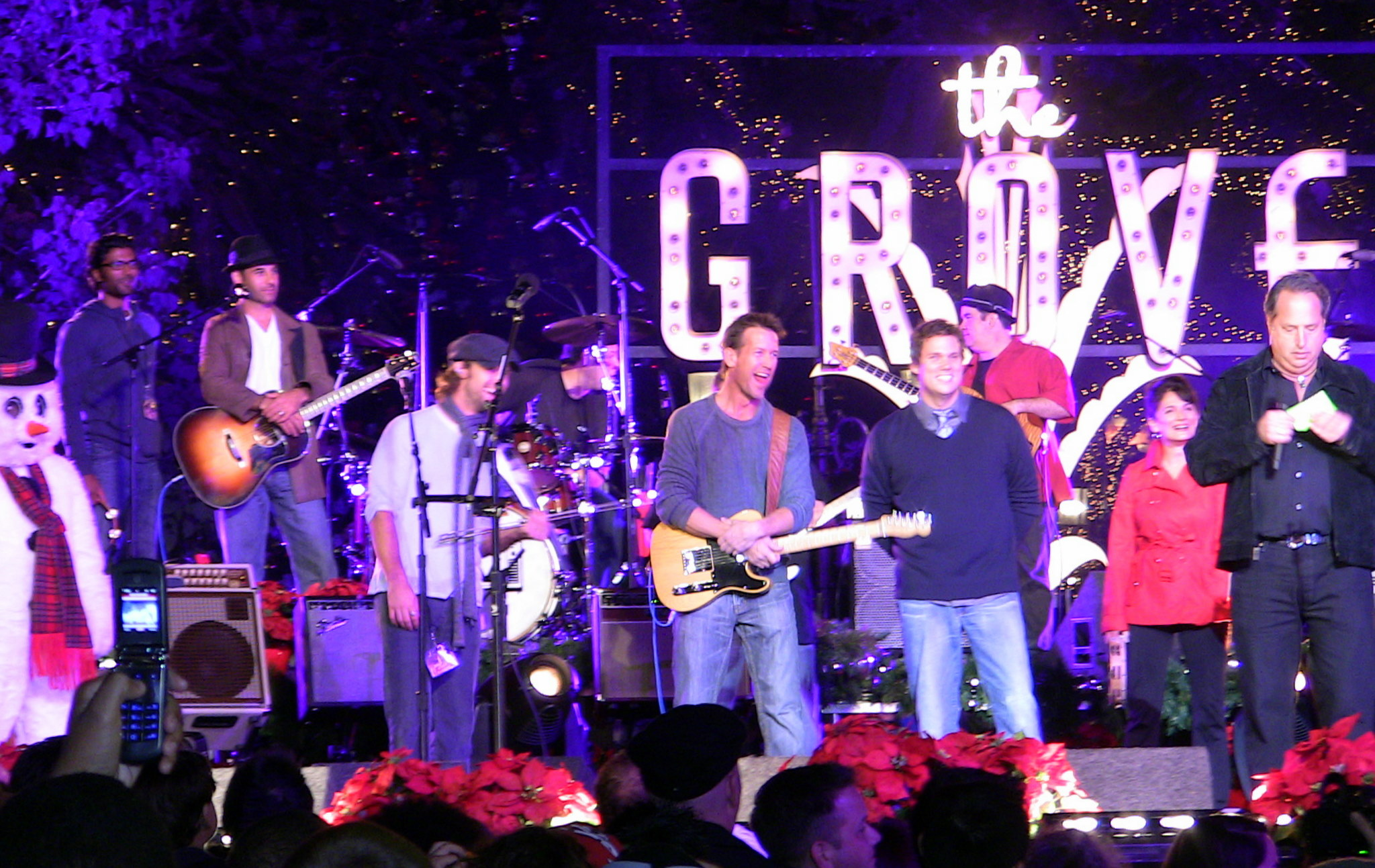
- Band from TV performing live (Kristin, November 23, 2008)

Background information
- Origin: United States
- Genre: Cover band
- Years active: 2006—present
- Members: Greg Grunberg; James Denton; Jesse Spencer; Bob Guiney; Adrian Pasdar; Scott Grimes; Hugh Laurie; Teri Hatcher
- Past members: Rich Winer; David Anders; Bonnie Somerville; Chris Kelley; Barry Sarna; Jon Sarna; Brad Savage; Bryan McCann; Chris Mostert
- Website: http://www.bandfromtv.org

Band from TV is a charity cover band whose members are all actors from American television series. They donate the proceeds of their performances and recordings to the charities of their choice.

== Band history ==
Band from TV made their debut at the 58th Primetime Emmy Awards TV Guide afterparty and as of 2007 plays high-paying charity concerts and perform for studio albums. They contributed a song ("You Can't Always Get What You Want") to the House M.D. Original Television Soundtrack, as well as releasing their own album: Hoggin' All the Covers (recorded in July 2007).

Band from TV has not been very active following nearly steady performances from April 2008 to June 2012, with only one performance in 2013, one in 2014, and seven in 2015. As of 2022 there have been no live performances since a private event in early 2016. In 2016 they released a Christmas EP through Bandcamp.

== Current members ==
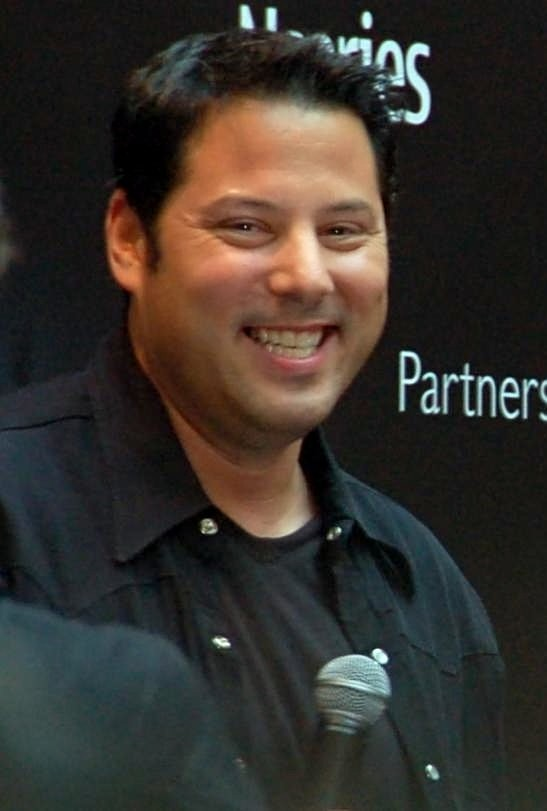
Actor Greg Grunberg, band founder

- Greg Grunberg – Drums
- James Denton - Guitar
- Jesse Spencer – Violin
- Bob Guiney – Vocals
- Adrian Pasdar – Guitar
- Scott Grimes – Keyboards
- Hugh Laurie – Keyboards, Vocals
- Teri Hatcher – Vocals

=== Supporting cast and guest stars ===
- David Anders – Vocals
- Lester Holt – Bass
- Chris Kelley – Guitar
- Bryan McCann
- Chris Mostert – Saxophone
- Barry Sarna – Keyboards
- Jon Sarna – Percussion
- Brad Savage – Bass, Vocals
- Bonnie Somerville – Vocals
- Kim Conrad - Percussion

== See also ==
- Rock Bottom Remainders – American charity rock band
- Middle Aged Dad Jam Band - American celebrity jam band
