= Ky Baldwin =

- Born: Sydney, New South Wales, Australia
- Genres: Pop, trip hop
- Occupations: Singer, dancer, actor
- Instruments: Vocals, guitar, drums, piano
- Years active: 2009–present
- Website: kybaldwin.com

Ky Baldwin is an Australian singer, songwriter, dancer, actor and parkour athlete. He is known for his music videos on his YouTube channel.

== Early life ==
Although his youth was mainly spent playing sports, at the age of six he started tap dancing with Dein Perry's "Tap Pups". From there Baldwin continued to learn other genres such as hip hop and jazz.

== Acting career ==
At age seven, Baldwin was cast as "Trouble" in Madame Butterfly performing at the Sydney Opera House. Other theatre roles have included Gustave in Andrew Lloyd Webber's Love Never Dies and a performance in Dylan Thomas's Under Milk Wood at the Sydney Theatre Company. He played Michael Banks in Disney's Mary Poppins in Auckland, New Zealand.

At age nine, Baldwin entered into Australia's Got Talent with his own tap dancing routine. He became that year's youngest semi-finalist, but exited the series after it fell to the judges' vote.

Baldwin has featured in other Australian series including Spirited, East West 101, Underbelly: Razor. He provided the voice of Little Nutbrown Hare in the animated series Guess How Much I Love You (Season 1 & 2). In 2014, Baldwin was a semi-finalist in the inaugural season of The Voice Kids as part of Team Delta.

Baldwin was cast as the young Peter Allen in the two-part TV biopic, Peter Allen: Not the Boy Next Door. In April 2016 he won the AACTA Award for Best Guest or Supporting Actor in a Television Drama and a Logie Award (Graham Kennedy Breakthrough Star of Tomorrow) for this role.

Baldwin has collaborated with DreamworksTV and Disney Channel and he has been chosen as a Disney Diary Vlogger. He works with DreamWorks for their "Songs That Stick" series.

The actor co-starred in the 2022 Nickelodeon Movies remake, Snow Day., which streams as of Dec 21, 2022, on Paramount+.

Baldwin now lives in Los Angeles.

He competed in World Chase Tag's Pan-American Championship as a member of Tempest. He transferred to Hollywood Freerunners for the WCT6 World Championship.

== Music career ==
Baldwin released his first EP "The Beginning" in 2014 and The Beginning with five original songs including "You Make Me Wanna Dance", "Do You Remember", "We're Young", "Lara" and "It's Time". The EP also included three cover songs.

In May 2017, Baldwin released the first single from his second EP "Dare to Believe" called "Just Dance", which was a finalist on Musical.ly's "Next Wave: May". Baldwin's single Invisible is a duet with Jillian Shea Spaeder Jillian Shea Spaeder Official website. Spaeder has also been featured in three of Baldwin's YouTube videos including We Don't Talk Anymore, Perfect and ColdWater.

Baldwin's original songs include:

- You Make Me Wanna Dance
- Lara
- Do You Remember
- It's Time
- Why
- Just Dance
- Summer Song
- Goodbye
- Dear Mom
- Depression Is A Monster
