= Slay Day =

- Directed by: John David Buxton
- Written by: Andrew Matisziw
- Produced by: Mark Dragin; Michael Kagan; Scott C. Silver
- Distributed by: CtrlMovie
- Release date: February 12, 2027
- Country: United States
- Language: English

Slay Day is an upcoming American interactive slasher film directed by editor John David Buxton in his directorial debut from a screenplay by Andrew Matisziw.

== Cast ==
- Jayden Bartels
- Shelby Simmons
- Emma McNulty
- Caleb Brown
- Luke Mullen
- Corrado Martini
- Lyndon Smith

== Production ==
In August 2025, Slay Day was approved for an Utah Motion Picture Incentive by the Utah Film Commission. Principal photography took place in Salt Lake County. The film received financial support from BluePoint Capital.

== Release ==
Slay Day is distributed by CtrlMovie and will have a theatrical release on February 12, 2027 in "one of the first-ever, large-scale rollouts of an interactive film". The audience interaction feature is reported to be facilitated through smartphones with the subsequent release planned for gaming consoles.
