= Lyndon Smith =

American actress

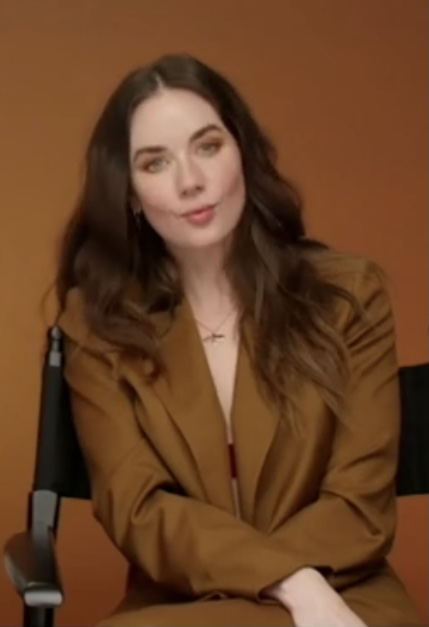
- Smith in 2022
- Born: June 7, 1989 (age 37)
- Education: University of Florida
- Occupation: Actress
- Years active: 2010–present
- Spouse: Steve Talley (m. 2015)

Lyndon Smith is an American actress. She is known for her roles as Natalie in the NBC drama Parenthood (2013–2015) and Deirdre in the TNT police drama Public Morals (2015).

== Personal life and education ==
Smith is from Pensacola, Florida and graduated from the University of Florida in 2012. In 2015 she married actor Steve Talley in Kauai, Hawaii.

== Career ==
In 2013, Smith began playing the recurring role of Natalie on the NBC drama series Parenthood, a role she played for the series' final two seasons. In 2014, she joined the cast of Ed Burns's 2015 TNT police drama series, Public Morals.

In 2016, Smith was cast in the film Step Sisters, which was released on Netflix in 2018.

== Filmography ==
=== Film ===
Year	Title	Role	Notes
2014	The Forger	Melanie	
2014	Vile	Fiona	Short film
2015	Alleluia! The Devil's Carnival	Cora / Applicant	
2015	Secret in Their Eyes	Kit	
2016	Bleed	Skye	
2018	Step Sisters	Danielle	
2018	Psycho Nurse	Gwen	Film
2019	Lillian.	Victoria	Short film
2023	Fool's Paradise	Alice	
2023	Devil on My Doorstep	Chloe	TV movie
2026	Slay Day	Ms Paige	
TBA	El Tonto	Alice	Post-production

=== Television ===
Year	Title	Role	Notes
2010	That's What She Said!	Becca	Main role; 8 episodes
2012	Cassandra French's Finishing School for Boys	Claire	Unaired television pilot (MTV)
2013	Reckless	Allie	Unaired television pilot (ABC)
2013	90210	Michaela	Recurring role; 8 episodes
2013	Californication	Girl	Episode: "The Unforgiven"
2013–2015	Parenthood	Natalie	Recurring role (seasons 5–6); 19 episodes
2014	Hawaii Five-0	Lauren Parrish	Episode: "Na hala a ka makua"
2014	The Tomorrow People	Mallory	Episode: "Superhero"
2014	Stalker	Laurie	Episode: "The Haunting"
2015	Extant	Kelsey Richter	Recurring role (season 2); 6 episodes
2015	Public Morals	Deirdre	Main role; 10 episodes
2015	CSI: Cyber	Tracy Jacobs	Episode: "Heart Me"
2015	The Middle	Holly Haypek	Recurring role; 2 episodes
2016	Cooper Barrett's Guide to Surviving Life	Lena	Episode: "How to Survive Your Crazy Ex"
2016	Roadies	Bethany Ian-Crouch	Episode: "Carpet Season"
2016	12 Deadly Days	Amy	Recurring role; 2 episodes
2017	Lethal Weapon	Owlsly	Episode: "Homebodies"
2017	Colony	Frankie	Episode: "Free Radicals"
2017	The Originals	Lara	Episode: "Keepers of the House"
2017	Outcast	Elegant Woman	Episode: "To the Sea"
2017	I'm Sorry	Miss Shelly	Recurring role; 2 episodes
2017	White Famous	Gwen	Recurring role; 5 episodes
2018	9-1-1	Kate	Episode: "Heartbreaker"
2018	Crazy Ex-Girlfriend	Mona	Recurring role; 4 episodes
2018	Dead Inside	Emmy Gates	Unaired television series
2019	The Rookie	Astrid Heisserer	Episode: "Greenlight"; as Lyndon Talley-Smith
2019	Lucifer	Kylie the Rocker	Episode: "Somebody's Been Reading Dante's Inferno"
2019	Psycho Nurse	Gwen	Television film; also known as Munchausen by Internet
2019	Sorry for Your Loss	Lacey	Recurring role; 3 episodes
2019-2020	Truth Be Told	Chandra Willets	Recurring role; 2 episodes
2020	NCIS	Lieutenant Rebecca Weeks	Episode: "Flight Plan"
2021	The Good Doctor	Abby Clemmis	Episode: "Piece of Cake"
2022	The Woman in the House Across the Street from the Girl in the Window	Ms. Patrick	Episode: #1.4
2022	Fear the Walking Dead	Ava Sanderson	Episode: "Gone"
2022–2023	National Treasure: Edge of History	FBI Agent Ross	Main role; 9 episodes
