= Custody (2007 film) =

- Main cast of Custody 2007. From left to right: Rob Morrow, Kay Panabaker, and James Denton
- Written by: Kathy Kloves, Mary Herczog
- Directed by: Nadia Tass
- Starring: Rob Morrow; Kay Panabaker; James Denton
- Music by: Kari Kimmel and Chris Hajian
- Country of origin: United States
- Original language: English

Production
- Producer: Sky Cinema / Lifetime
- Cinematography: David Parker
- Running time: 96 minutes

Original release
- Release: September 8, 2007

Custody is a 2007 Lifetime television movie starring Rob Morrow, James Denton, and Kay Panabaker about a widower's fight for custody of the daughter he raised and legally adopted, when her birth father who abandoned her returns. Aired on September 8, 2007. It was filmed in and around Ottawa on locations such as the University of Ottawa, Rideau Canal, and Le Chateau Montebello. It is based on the book Figures of Echo by Mary S. Herczog.

== Cast ==
- Rob Morrow as David Gordon
- Kay Panabaker as Amanda Gordon
- James Denton as John Sullivan
- Robin Brûlé as Megan
- Sergio Di Zio as Eugene
- Allana Harkin as Barbara
- Gord Rand as Peyton
- Brenda Bazinet
- Pierre Brault
- Dominique Bisson as Susan
- France Veins
- Bella Szpala as Young Amanda

== Reception ==
Variety said, "While Custody isn’t necessarily bad, then, it’s so inconsequential as to fail the test inherent in the story itself — namely, if somebody tried to take this movie away, it’s hard to imagine anybody petitioning to stop them."
