= James Denton =

American actor (born 1963)

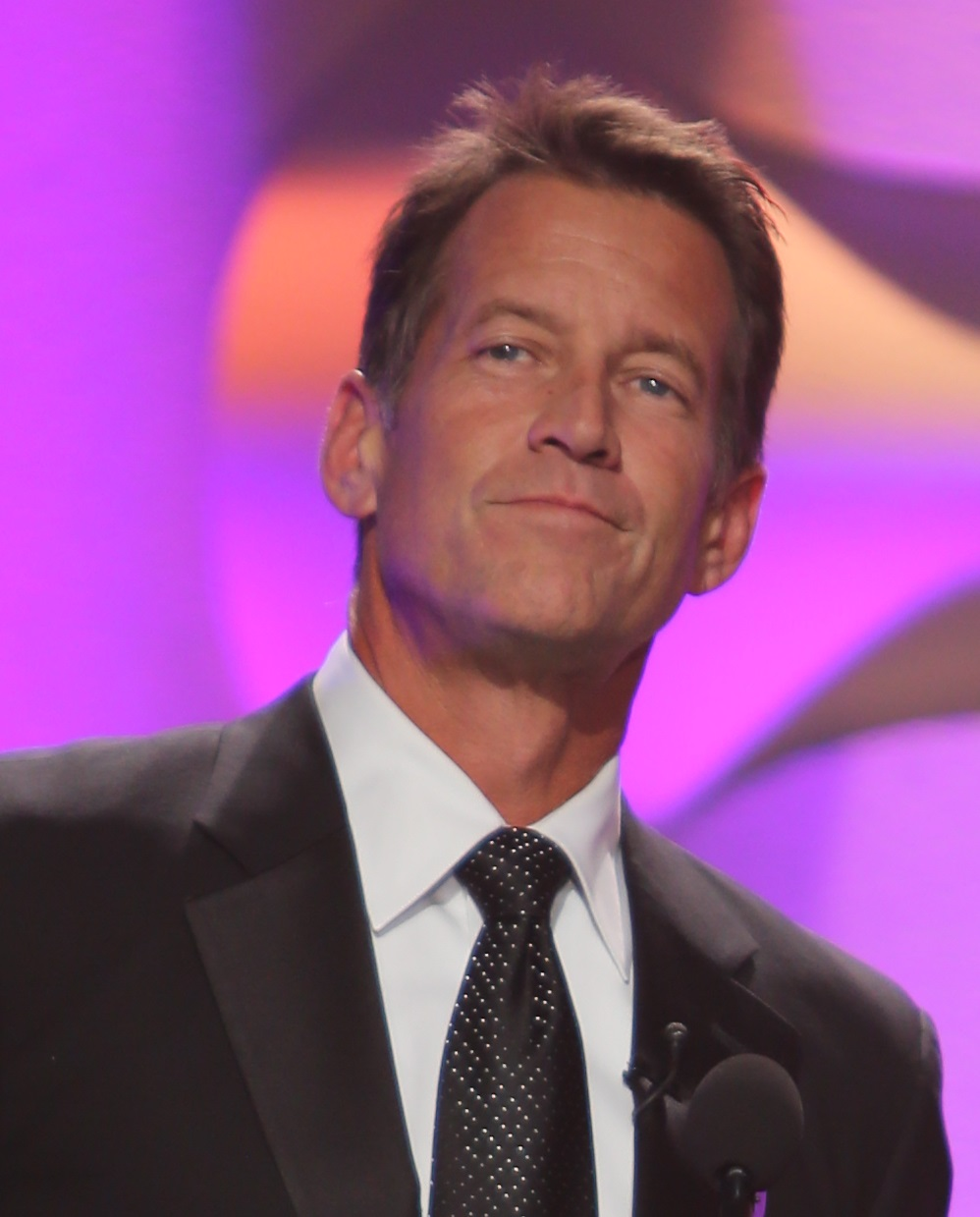
- Denton in 2014
- Born: January 20, 1963 (age 63); Nashville, Tennessee, U.S.
- Other name: Jamie Denton
- Occupation: Actor
- Years active: 1993–present
- Spouses: Jenna Lyn Ward (m. 1997; div. 2000); Erin O'Brien (m. 2002)
- Children: 2

James Denton (born January 20, 1963) is an American film and television actor. He is known for playing Mike Delfino on ABC's comedy drama series Desperate Housewives (2004–2012) and Dr. Sam Radford on Hallmark Channel's fantasy series Good Witch (2015–2021).

== Early life ==
Denton was born January 20, 1963, in Nashville, Tennessee, and grew up in nearby Goodlettsville, the second of three children. His father, J.T. Denton (1930–1993), was a dentist who had served in the military. His mother died of breast cancer in 2002. Denton was raised Southern Baptist and became a Minister of Music at Westmoreland United Methodist Church in Westmoreland, Tennessee.

Denton graduated from Goodlettsville High School, and attended the University of Tennessee, where he is a member of the Tennessee Kappa chapter of Sigma Alpha Epsilon fraternity. He majored in Television/Journalism, and earned a degree in Advertising. Before becoming an actor, he sold advertising for two radio stations. He began acting at the age of 23, at a community theater in Nashville. He eventually moved to California to become a full-time actor. Early in his career, he was sometimes credited as Jamie Denton.

== Career ==
While living in Chicago, Denton's first role was as "Stanley" in A Streetcar Named Desire, and his last role was as the terrorist "Bebert" in the French farce, Lapin Lapin. In the years that came between the two roles, Denton was a company member at The Griffin Theater and at Strawdog Theater Ensemble. He added a steady string of roles and accolades to his quickly growing list of achievements, including one of the leads in the world premiere of Flesh and Blood, performing in and composing the music for The Night Hank Williams Died, and his portrayal of Kentucky preacher "C.C. Showers" in The Diviners - which gained him a nomination for a Best Actor Joseph Jefferson Award (Chicago's only theater award).

After moving to Los Angeles, Denton continued to perform on stage, usually during hiatus from whichever TV series to which he was attached at the time. Several plays and independent films in which Denton has appeared, have been written by his friend, Mike Petty. For example, "In Walked Monk", in which Denton played the role of "Steven" during the summer of 1999 and Locked Up Down Shorty's", in which he played the role of "Danny", during the summer of 2001.

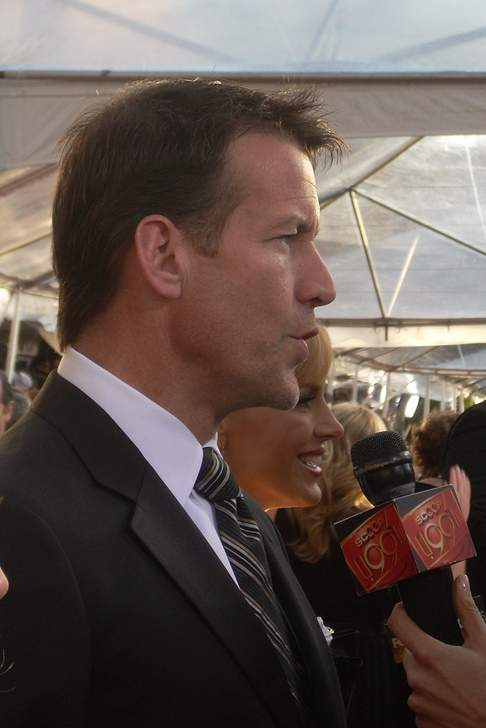
James Denton at 16th Screen Actors Guild Awards

Denton has appeared in several films, including: That Old Feeling (1997), Face/Off (1997), and Primary Colors (1998). He has appeared in various television shows, including: Sliders, Dark Skies, Two Guys and a Girl, Ally McBeal, The West Wing, and JAG, and has had recurring roles in The Pretender, Philly, The Drew Carey Show and Reba. In 2003, he portrayed the lead role of Special Agent John Kilmer in the short-lived crime thriller series Threat Matrix.

In 2004, Denton began portraying Mike Delfino on ABC's comedy-drama television series Desperate Housewives. The show was well received by viewers and critics and it won multiple Primetime Emmy, Golden Globe and Screen Actors Guild Awards. From the 2004–05 through the 2008–09 television seasons, its first five seasons were rated amongst the top ten most-watched series. In 2007, it was reported to be the most popular show in its demographic worldwide, with an audience of approximately 120 million and was also reported as the third most watched television series in a study of ratings in twenty countries.

Since first appearing in Desperate Housewives, Denton continued to appear in numerous films, including: Assumption (2006), Beautiful Dreamer (2006), Undead or Alive (2007), Custody (2007), Tortured (2008) and All-Star Superman (2011). Denton also appeared in Dale Watson's music video for "Justice for All" (2007) and Phil Vassar's music video for "Bobbi with an I" (2009).

Denton portrayed Dr. Sam Radford, a starring role on Hallmark Channel's fantasy comedy-drama television series Good Witch. The series follows a mother-daughter duo's magical journey as they welcome Dr. Sam Radford (Denton) and his son to town. The New York Times called the series "a gentle, sentimental prime-time fable set in an idealized Middle American small city (not an angsty suburb), is the show you find your parents or grandparents watching when you come home for a visit." In 2019, the show was one of the network's most popular original series, and the Good Witch closed season five in first place among household ratings on Sundays. The success of the series lifted the Hallmark Channel to be the highest-rated and most-watched cable network on the weekends.

In 2016, he had a recurring role as Peter Hudson on Lifetime's comedy-drama series Devious Maids. In 2018, he made a guest appearance as Navy Captain Deckard on CBS' television series NCIS: New Orleans, in the episode "Checkmate, Part 2". In January 2024, Denton was announced as a contestant in the 13th season of dance competition television series Danse avec les stars, the French version of Dancing with the Stars. He sustained an injury early in the competition and was unable to compete in two performances.

=== Other ventures ===
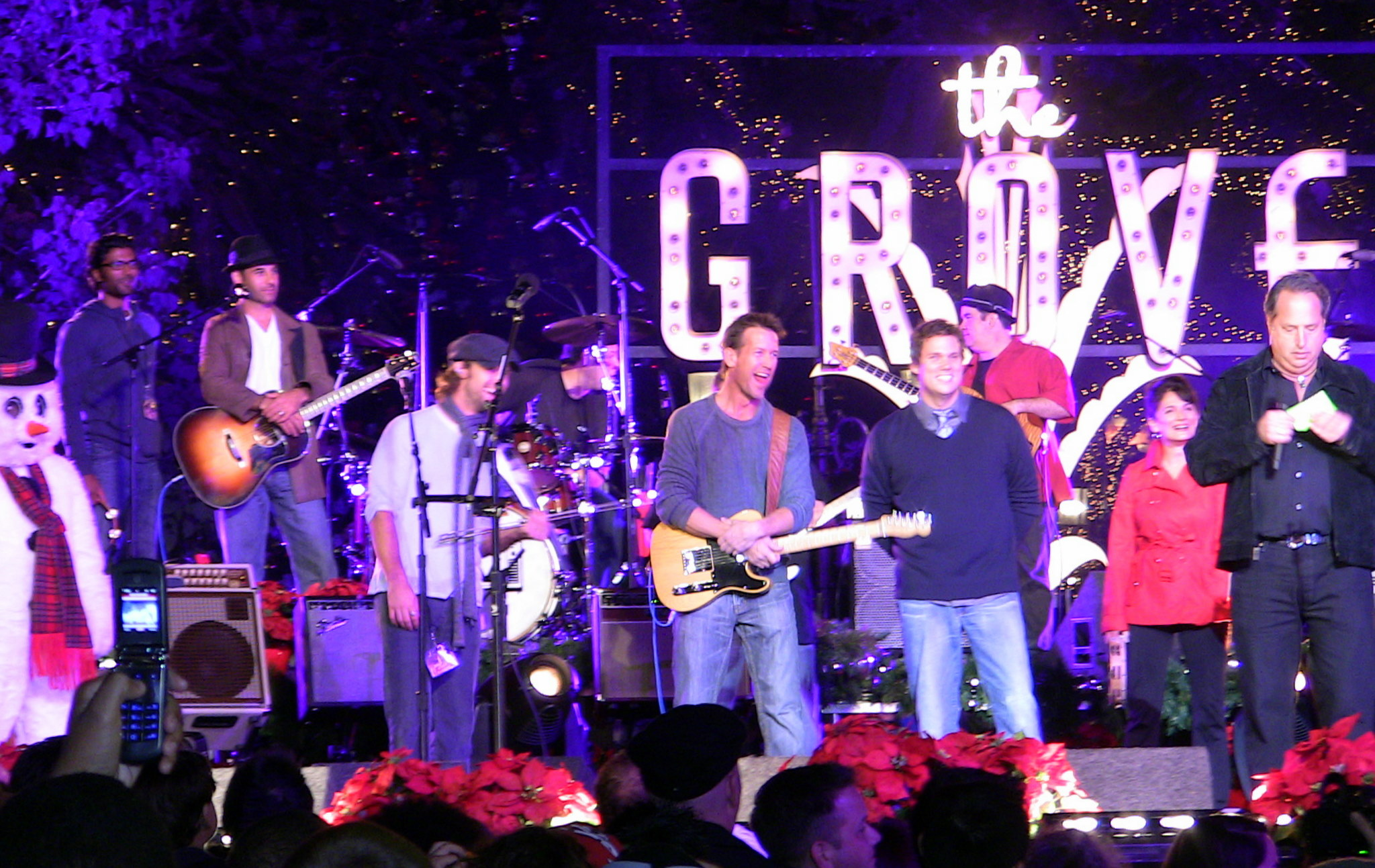
Band from TV performing in November 2018, (left to right: Sendhil Ramamurthy, Adrian Pasdar, Jesse Spencer, Denton, Bob Guiney, Cristine Rose, Jon Lovitz)

Denton plays guitar in the charity cover band Band from TV along with Hugh Laurie, Teri Hatcher, and Greg Grunberg, among others. They donate the proceeds of their performances and recordings to the charities of their choice. Band from TV has raised almost two million dollars for various causes supported by the band.

He has appeared on the cover of several magazines, including TV Guide, Tango, Orange Coast, Calabasas and Spectrum United, and pictorials for Entertainment Weekly, People, US Weekly and Life & Style. Denton has appeared in television commercials for Buick and Ford Warriors in Pink. Denton modeled for Daniel Hechter's 2012 Spring/Summer advertising campaign.

== Personal life ==
Denton dated country music singer Deana Carter in high school. He was married to Jenna Lyn Ward from 1997 to 2000. On December 16, 2002, Denton married Erin O'Brien, a personal trainer at Life Time Fitness. They have a son born in 2003 and a daughter born in 2005. The couple previously lived in Glendale, California. After Desperate Housewives ended, the family moved to Chanhassen, Minnesota.

Denton has supported the Angel Foundation, a nonprofit organization based in Minnesota, serving adults with cancer and their families.

== Filmography ==
Film and television roles
Year	Title	Role	Notes
1993	Thieves Quartet	Ray Higgs	
1994	Basic Football	The Quarterback	Short film
1995	Hunter's Moon	Nick	
1996	Sliders	Jack Bullock	Episode: "The Good, the Bad and the Wealthy"
1996	Moloney	Rocky Talese	Episode: "Friendly Fire"
1996	Dark Skies	Robert Winter	Episode: "Hostile Convergence"
1996–2003	JAG	Lieutenant Commander Bruce Carmichael / Geoffrey Roizman	2 episodes
1997	That Old Feeling	Keith Marks	
1997	Face/Off	Buzz	
1997–2000	The Pretender	Mr. Lyle	36 episodes
1998	Primary Colors	Mitch	
2000	Locked Up Down Shorty's	Danny	
2000	Two Guys, a Girl and a Pizza Place	Dr. Howard Zaunaveld	Episode: "The Monitor Story"
2000	Ally McBeal	Jimmy Bender	Episode: "Do You Wanna Dance?"
2000	The West Wing	Tom Jordan	Episode: "The Midterms"
2001	The Pretender 2001	Mr. Lyle	Television film
2001	The Pretender: Island of the Haunted	Mr. Lyle	Television film
2001–2002	Philly	Judge Augustus Ripley	13 episodes
2002	The Drew Carey Show	Daryl	2 episodes
2003–2004	Threat Matrix	Special Agent John Kilmer	16 episodes
2004	Jumbo Girl	Jack	Short film
2004–2012	Desperate Housewives	Mike Delfino	158 episodes Screen Actors Guild Award for Outstanding Performance by an Ensemble in a Comedy Series (2005, 2006); Nominated –Screen Actors Guild Award for Outstanding Performance by an Ensemble in a Comedy Series (2007, 2008, 2009); Teen Choice award for Best TV actor
2005–2006	Reba	Dr. Jack Morgan	Episodes: "Date of Mirth" and "The Trouble with Dr. Hunky"
2006	Assumption	John	Short film ShockerFest Science Fiction Genre Award for Best Actor Fantasy / Science Fiction
2006	Beautiful Dreamer	Dr. Kessler	
2007	Ascension Day	Brother John	
2007	Undead or Alive: A Zombedy	Elmer Winslow	
2007	Masters of Science Fiction	Barney Curran	Episode: "The Discarded"
2007	Custody	John Sullivan	
2008	American Idol	Band from TV	Episode: "Idol Gives Back"
2008	Tortured	Agent Murphy	
2010	Group Sex	Luke	Uncredited
2011	All-Star Superman	Superman / Clark Kent	Voice
2012	Hot in Cleveland	Kerouac Cowboy	Episode: "Storage Wars"
2012	Karaoke Man	Slim	
2013	Grace Unplugged	Johnny Trey	
2013–2019	Home & Family	Himself	Guest and guest co-host; 9 episodes
2014	Outnumbered	Himself	Guest co-host; Episode: "Episode dated 7 October 2014"
2014	Stranded in Paradise	Carter	
2014	Hunger in America	Narrator	Documentary film; also co-executive producer
2015–2021	Good Witch	Dr. Sam Radford	Main cast; 75 episodes
2016	Devious Maids	Peter Hudson	Recurring role; 7 episodes
2016	For Love & Honor	Tom Brennan	Television film; also as executive producer
2018	NCIS: New Orleans	Navy Captain Deckard	Episode: "Checkmate, Part 2"
2018	Wake.	Joe Frederickson	Film
2020	Selfie Dad	Steve	Film
2021	A Kiss Before Christmas	Ethan Holt	Television film; also as executive producer
2022	Perfect Harmony	Jack Chandeller	Television film; also as executive producer
2023	Christmas on Cherry Lane	Nelson King	Television film
2023	Fantasy Island	Dutch	Episode: "Paymer vs. Paymer"
2024	Danse avec les stars	Himself	Contestant on season 13
2026	Happy's Place	JB	Episode: "Love Birds"

Preceded by Chris Harrison	Host of Miss America; 2006	Succeeded by Mario Lopez
