= Fountain Hills Times Independent =

Newspaper in Fountain Hills, Arizona

- Type: Weekly newspaper
- Format: Broadsheet
- Owner(s): Independent Newsmedia, Inc.
- Founder: Alan Cruikshank
- Editor: Ryan Winslett
- Founded: 1974
- Language: English
- Headquarters: 16508 E. Laser Drive, Suite 101, Fountain Hills, AZ
- Circulation: 3,519 (as of 2022)
- Website: fhtimes.com

The Fountain Hills Times Independent is a weekly newspaper covering Maricopa County, Arizona, USA, published in Fountain Hills, Arizona.

== History ==
In February 1974, the publishing company Western States Publishers, Inc. was formed by Alan Cruikshank, Arthur Hewitt and Bob Lightfoot, who owned the Lake Havasu City Herald. On June 27, 1974, the business published the first edition of The Fountain Hills Times.

Lightfoot sold his shares to Hewitt. In 1989, Hewitt died, and Cruikshank acquired the remaining shares from his widow. In 2022, Cruikshank died. In 2023, Independent Newsmedia, Inc., acquired the paper from his widow and renamed it to the Fountain Hills Times Independent.
