= Selfie Dad =

2020 American faith-based film

- Promotional release poster
- Directed by: Brad J. Silverman
- Written by: Brad J. Silverman
- Produced by: Paul L. Long
- Starring: Michael Jr.; Chonda Pierce; James Denton; Karen Abercrombie; Jamie Grace
- Cinematography: Ulf Soderqvist
- Edited by: Vaughn Bien III; Richard Nord
- Music by: David Siebels
- Production company: Kappa Studios
- Distributed by: GVN Releasing
- Release date: June 19, 2020
- Running time: 97 minutes
- Country: United States
- Language: English

Selfie Dad is a 2020 American faith-based comedy-drama film written and directed by Brad J. Silverman. It stars stand-up comedian Michael Jr. as Ben Marcus, a former stand-up comic who attempts to become a social media star. The film's cast also includes Chonda Pierce, James Denton, Karen Abercrombie, and Jamie Grace.

Selfie Dad was originally scheduled for a theatrical release, but was instead released on video-on-demand (VOD) services due to the COVID-19 pandemic.

== Cast ==
- Michael Jr. as Ben Marcus
- Chonda Pierce as Rosie
- James Denton as Steve
- Karen Abercrombie as Carol
- Jamie Grace as Herself

== Reception ==
Joe Leydon of Variety called Selfie Dad "a more emotional and satisfying piece of work" in comparison to a previous film by writer-director Silverman, Grace Unplugged (2013). Leydon also wrote that Selfie Dad contains, "beneath all the funny business, some well-observed truths" regarding race relations in the United States, but noted that, "right now, those truths may be, well, more than a tad distracting from the story Silverman set out to tell."

Shannon M., in a review of the film for The Dove Foundation (a non-profit organization that publishes reviews "based on Christian values"), called it "a heart-warming film that reveals the truth of Hebrews 4:12."
