= Gabrielle Nevaeh =

American actress (born 2005)

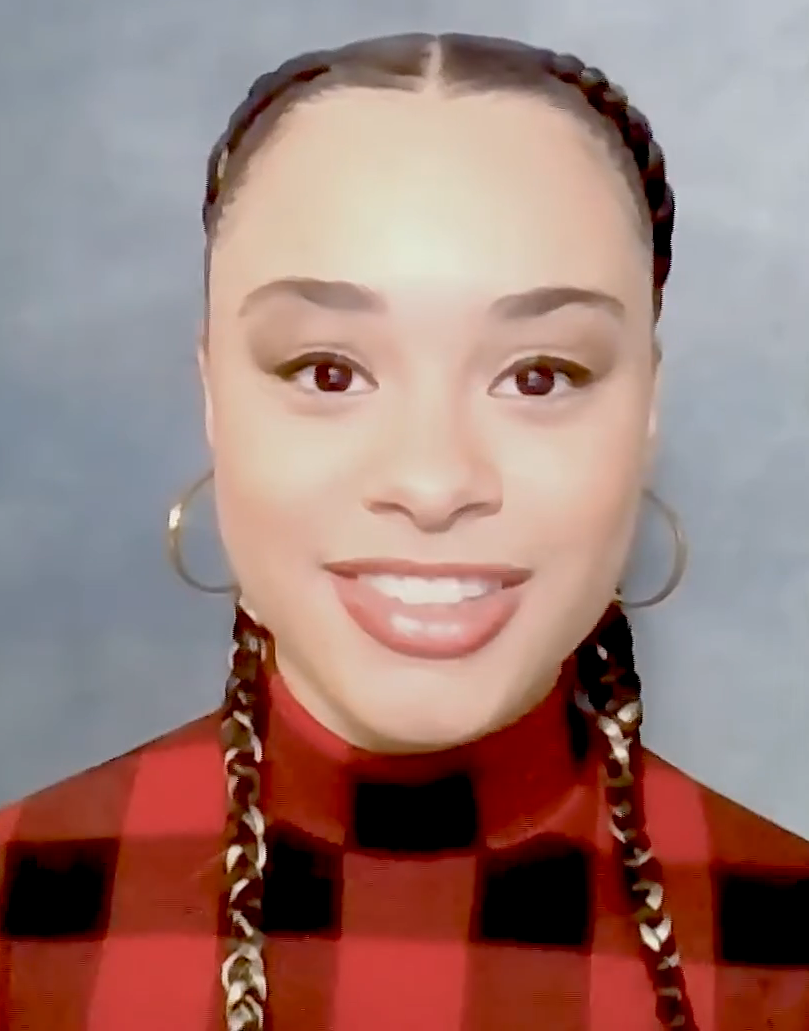
- Neavaeh in 2021
- Born: May 5, 2005 (age 21); Miramar, Florida, U.S.
- Occupation: Actress
- Years active: 2018–present

Gabrielle Nevaeh (born May 5, 2005) is an American actress. She is best known for her leading role as Sadie Alexander in the comedy series That Girl Lay Lay, Clawdeen Wolf in the fantasy series Monster High and Patty Newby in the hit broadway show Stranger Things: The First Shadow. She made history as the first female and first Black female to call an NFL Wildcard game and has been nominated for an Emmy for her contributions to Nick News.

== Early life ==
Neveah was born in Miramar, Florida. She moved to Los Angeles with her family and now considers it her home. She described herself as extremely shy growing up.

== Career ==
Neveah's first leading role was playing various characters in the comedy sketch series All That. Her first big role came playing Sadie Alexander in the comedy series That Girl Lay Lay. She played the lead role of Clawdeen Wolf in the comedy series Monster High. In 2025 she made her Broadway debut portraying Patty Newby in Stranger Things: The First Shadow.

== Filmography ==
=== Film ===
Year	Title	Role	Notes
2018	Lying Together	Mandy	Short
2019	By Way of Art	Gwen	Short

=== Television ===
Year	Title	Role	Notes
2018	Speechless	Trina	Episode: "N-e-- New JJ"
2019–2020	All That	Various	42 episodes
2020	Danger Force	Maddie	2 episodes
2021–2024	That Girl Lay Lay	Sadie Alexander	41 episodes
2022	Side Hustle	Sadie Alexander	Episode: "When Worlds Collide"
2022–2023	Monster High Mysteries	Clawdeen Wolf	Voice role; 7 episodes
2022–2024	Monster High	Clawdeen Wolf	Voice role; 48 episodes
2023	Monster Ball Homecoming	Clawdeen Wolf	Voice role;6 episodes
2023–2024	Curses	Pandora Vanderhouven	20 episodes
2023–2025	Gremlins	Elle	Voice role; 20 episodes
2024	Everybody Still Hates Chris	Chris' Girlfriend	Episode: "Everybody Still Hates Jackie Robinson"
2025	The Thundermans: Undercover	Kiefer	3 episodes

== Theater ==
Year	Title	Role	Notes
2025	Stranger Things: The First Shadow	Patty Newby	
