= Jayden Bartels =

American actress (born 2004)

- Born: November 1, 2004 (age 21); Los Angeles, California, U.S.
- Occupations: Influencer; YouTuber; actress; singer; dancer

YouTube information
- Channel: Jayden Bartels
- Years active: 2015–present
- Genres: Vlogs; music; fashion; comedy
- Views: 92.19 million
- Musical career
- Genres: Pop
- Instruments: Vocals
- Years active: 2018–present
- Last updated: March 19, 2024
- Website: www.jaydenbartels.com (archived)

Jayden Isabel Bartels (born November 1, 2004) is an American Internet personality, actress and singer. On television, she is known for her roles in the Disney Channel series Coop & Cami Ask the World (2018–2020), the Nickelodeon series Side Hustle (2020–2022) and the Disney+ series Goosebumps (2025). She also appeared on Dance Moms alongside Maddie and Mackenzie Ziegler. Bartels rose to fame in 2016 on TikTok (at the time known as musical.ly), gaining over 8 million followers. Bartels has also released original music, including "Alphabet" (2020).

== Early life ==
Bartels was born in Los Angeles on November 1, 2004. She has been taking musical theater, ballet, hip hop, jazz, songwriting and acting classes since age eight. Her mother is a yoga instructor and her father is a computer repairman. Her parents were reluctant at first with their daughter getting involved in social media, but started assisting her in video production once her musical.ly career took off, enabling her to produce up to 12 videos per day. Bartels was home-schooled to keep up with her career.

== Career ==
Bartels began her acting career in 2015 at the age of 11, when she appeared in episodic roles in the television shows: It's Always Sunny in Philadelphia, Nicky, Ricky, Dicky & Dawn, Walk the Prank, Kidding, Family Reunion, The Really Loud House and Alert: Missing Persons Unit.

Bartels made her television debut in the comedy series Clique Wars, where she played the supporting role of Taylor. She was cast alongside Laura Krystine and Brisa Lalich in the television film To the Beat!, which was released on March 18, 2018. Bartels had a recurring role in Disney Channel comedy series Coop & Cami Ask the World, where she played the role of Peyton. She appeared in the comedy film Grand-Daddy Day Care directed by Ron Oliver, which was released on February 5, 2019.

Jayden has a YouTube channel where she enjoys creating all sorts of content from vlogs to clothing hauls which she shoots and edits herself. She created and directed all of her music videos for her original songs which also can be found on her channel.

In 2020, Bartels was cast to play the lead role in the Nickelodeon's series Side Hustle alongside Jules LeBlanc, Isaiah Crews, Mitchell Berg and Jacques Chevelle, which premiered on November 7, 2020. The series ended on June 30, 2022, after two seasons. She reprised the role of Avery in To the Beat!: Back 2 School. the second installment in To the Beat! series.

In 2025, Bartels appeared on the second season of the supernatural horror series Goosebumps. She has upcoming roles in the films Slay Day and Lullaby.

== Filmography ==
=== Film ===
Year	Title	Role	Notes
2017	When Pigs Fly	Esme	Short film
2018	To The Beat!	Avery	
2019	Grand-Daddy Day Care	Annie	
2020	To the Beat!: Back 2 School	Avery	
2026	Slay Day	Angie	
TBA	Lullaby	Jessica	

=== Television ===
Year	Title	Role	Notes
2015	Clique Wars	Taylor	2 episodes
2016	Dance Moms	Herself	1 episode
2017	It's Always Sunny in Philadelphia	Abby	Episode: "The Gang Goes to a Water Park"
2017	Nicky, Ricky, Dicky & Dawn	Olivia	Episode: "Ye Olde Hand Holde"
2017	Criminal Minds: Beyond Borders	Emma Garrett	Episodes: "Lost Souls", "The Ripper of Riga"
2017	Walk the Prank	Sarah Penu	Episode: "A Night Witch You'll Always Remember"
2018	Kidding	Robyn	1 episode
2018–2020	Coop & Cami Ask the World	Peyton	Recurring role
2019	Expert Attempters		3 episodes
2020–2022	Side Hustle	Presley	Main role
2020	Family Reunion	Astrid	Episode: "Remember When the Party Was Over?"
2020	Group Chat	Herself	Host; 13 episodes
2020	All That	Herself	Episode 1131
2023	The Really Loud House	Kiki Carlyle	Episode: "Heart and Soul"
2024	Alert: Missing Persons Unit	Kyra de la Cruz	1 episode
2025	Goosebumps	Cece	Main cast (season 2)

=== Music video ===
Song	Year	Artist	Notes
"Day & Night"	2016	Johnny Orlando & Mackenzie Ziegler	
"Monsters (aka Haters)"	2017	Mackenzie Ziegler	
"It's Gonna Show"	2018	Annie LeBlanc	
"The Man"	2020	Taylor Swift	
