= David A. Arnold =

American stand-up comedian, sitcom writer, and actor (1968–2022)

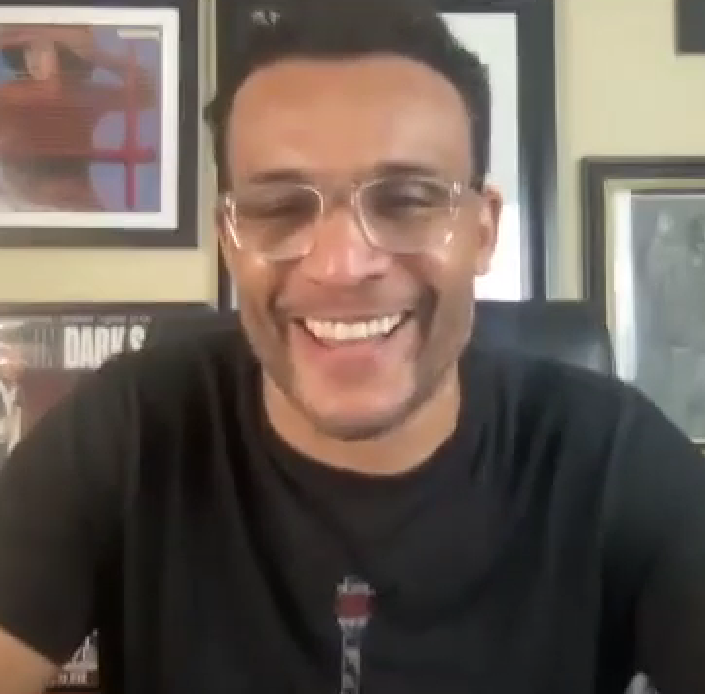
- Arnold in 2021
- Born: March 15, 1968; Cleveland, Ohio, U.S.
- Died: September 7, 2022 (aged 54); Los Angeles, California, U.S.
- Spouse: Julie L. Harkness (m. 2003)
- Children: 2

Comedy career
- Years active: 1997–2022
- Medium: Comedy, television
- Genre: Stand-up comedy

David A. Arnold (March 15, 1968 – September 7, 2022) was an American stand-up comedian, sitcom writer, producer, and actor.

== Stand-up comedy ==
Arnold began performing in 1997. He performed at the Canadian Montreal Comedy Festival, on Jamie Foxx Presents Laffapalooza (Comedy Central) with Jamie Foxx and Cedric the Entertainer, The Tom Joyner Show, Baisden After Dark, Comics Unleashed with Byron Allen, ComicView (BET), The Mo'Nique Show (BET), Entourage (HBO) and Def Comedy Jam.

In 2020 David released his first comedy special 'Fat Ballerina' on Netflix. Following up with 'It Ain't For The Weak' in 2022. Both were filmed in Cleveland, Ohio.

== Screenwriter and actor ==
Arnold served as writer and producer for the Netflix revival series Fuller House. He wrote episodes of several comedy shows, including Bigger (BET+), Meet the Browns (TBS), The Rickey Smiley Show (TV One), Raising Whitley (OWN), Tyler Perry's House of Payne (TBS), and The Tony Rock Project (MyNetworkTV).

In 2021, Arnold created the Nickelodeon show That Girl Lay Lay and served as showrunner for the series. He appeared in several television series including Meet the Browns, A Series of Unfortunate People and The Tony Rock Project.

Arnold had two stand-up comedy specials on Netflix, David A. Arnold: Fat Ballerina and It Ain't For The Weak (July 2022).

== Personal life ==
Arnold was married to Julie L. Harkness; the couple had two daughters, Anna-Grace (b. 2005) and Ashlyn (b. 2007). He was of African-American ancestry.

== Death ==
Arnold died on September 7, 2022, at the age of 54, while at home due to natural causes.

An episode of That Girl Lay Lay titled "Dylan and Rebecca's Cleve-Land-Land Adventure" was dedicated to Arnold.
