= List of Total Eclipse episodes =

Total Eclipse is a web television series streamed on the Brat network. The series premiered on April 5, 2018

== Plot ==
At Millwood high, Cassie and her band together to confront mean girls, boy drama, and their high school woes. But when reality becomes too much, they can always escape to their fantasy worlds.

== Cast ==
- Johnny Orlando as Sam
- Mackenzie Ziegler as Cassie
- Emily Skinner as Diana
- Lauren Orlando as Kate
- Nadia Turner as Jenna
- Devenity Perkins as Morgan
- Dominic Kline as Brayden
- Darius Marcell as Spencer
- Samuel Parker as Eli
- Paityn Hart as Georgia
- Lilia Buckingham as Autumn
- Sophia Strauss as herself
- Steffan Argus as Julian
- Logan Pepper as Luca

Lissette

== Production ==
Filming for Total Eclipse takes place in Los Angeles, California.

== Series overview ==
Season	Episodes	Originally released	
Season	Episodes	First released	Last released
1	10	April 5, 2018	June 7, 2018
2	11	September 6, 2018	November 22, 2018

== Episodes ==
=== Season 1 (2018) ===
No. overall	No. in season	Title	Directed by	Written by	Original release date
1	1	"Moonrise"	Meg Favreau	Jeff Jenkins	April 5, 2018
Cassie’s world is shaken up by a new arrival in Millwood.
2	2	"New Moon"	Meg Favreau	Jeff Jenkins	April 12, 2018
When their class is assigned a group project, Cassie sees an opportunity to get closer to Kate.
3	3	"Waxing Crescent"	Meg Favreau	Jeff Jenkins	April 19, 2018
Embarrassed by an old photo, Diana vows to get revenge.
4	4	"First Quarter"	Meg Favreau	Jeff Jenkins	April 26, 2018
It’s party night at Diana’s, but not everyone is in for a good time.
5	5	"Waxing Gibbous"	Meg Favreau	Jeff Jenkins	May 3, 2018
Cassie deals with the aftermath of the party, but she’s not the only one upset with Diana.
6	6	"Full Moon"	Meg Favreau	Jeff Jenkins	May 10, 2018
When Kate casts a love spell, the girls’ relationships start to change.
7	7	"Waning Gibbous"	Meg Favreau	Jeff Jenkins	May 17, 2018
Sam and Kate invite friends over on the same night.
8	8	"Last Quarter"	Meg Favreau	Jeff Jenkins	May 24, 2018
Brayden sets his sights on a new crush.
9	9	"Waning Crescent"	Meg Favreau	Jeff Jenkins	May 31, 2018
The girls prepare for the upcoming talent show.
10	10	"Moonset"	Meg Favreau	Jeff Jenkins	June 7, 2018
At the talent show, not all of the drama stays on stage.

=== Season 2 (2018) ===
No. overall	No. in season	Title	Directed by	Written by	Original release date
11	1	"Thangs"	Meg Favreau	Chris Campbell	September 6, 2018
With school back in session, the girls are assigned new extracurriculars.
12	2	"Solar Eclipse"	Meg Favreau	Chris Campbell	September 13, 2018
Secrets are revealed during the Solar Eclipse.
13	3	""The Princess Needs A Prince""	Meg Favreau	Chris Campbell	September 20, 2018
Diana focuses her campaign on an old flame.
14	4	"Meet Cameron"	Meg Favreau	Chris Campbell	September 27, 2018
Diana restores to dirty tricks to sway the class election.
15	5	"Happy Birthday"	Meg Favreau	Chris Campbell	October 4, 2018
Cassie gets a surprise gift on her birthday.
16	6	"A Pretender to the Throne"	Meg Favreau	Chris Campbell	October 18, 2018
Diana faces punishment for her bad behavior, and Kate goes to the dark side.
17	7	"Optional Compliment"	Meg Favreau	Chris Campbell	October 25, 2018
Cassie makes a choice between Kate and Sam.
18	8	"Coffeeshopwork"	Meg Favreau	Chris Campbell	November 1, 2018
Kate tries to pull away from Luca and his dark magic.
19	9	"New Partners"	Meg Favreau	Chris Campbell	November 8, 2018
Cassie finds out Jenna's secret.
20	10	"Blackmail"	Meg Favreau	Chris Campbell	November 15, 2018
Someone uses Jenna's secret against her.
21	11	"Find Your Voice"	Meg Favreau	Chris Campbell	November 22, 2018
The night of the winter formal, Cassie takes the blame for Jenna.
