= Personal effectiveness =

Self-help movement branch

Personal effectiveness is a branch of the self-help movement dealing with success, goals, and related concepts. Personal effectiveness integrates some ideas from “the power of positive thinking” and positive psychology but in general it is distinct from the New Thought Movement. A primary differentiating factor is that Personal Effectiveness proponents generally take a more systematic approach including a number of factors beside simple positive thinking. Some proponents take an approach with similarities to business process management techniques. Others may take a holistic spiritual and physical wellness approach.

== Beginnings ==
Many of the ideas behind the personal effectiveness movement derive from the field of business and management. Thinkers including Peter Drucker, W. Edwards Deming, and Genichi Taguchi revolutionized business and industry in the mid-20th century by focusing on such concepts as quality, efficiency, and optimization. In particular, Drucker's ideas of “management by objectives” as explained in his 1954 book 'The Practice of Management' emphasized the importance of clarity of roles, responsibilities, and expectations. They also outlined the framework of SMART goal setting. In the management field, these advancements branched into the leadership movement (for examples see Ken Blanchard, Jim Collins) and the more technical advancements including lean thinking, and six sigma.

== Overview ==
Early self-help classics such as Dale Carnegie's “How to Win Friends and Influence People” (first published in 1936) tended to have a specific focus on success in one particular goal. Although this trend continues, with common specializations in weight loss, health, or spirituality, a few contributors are becoming more interdisciplinary in their scope. As the field matured, authors began to integrate ideas gleaned from their peers, and a more comprehensive approach to personal effectiveness began to emerge.

Some key contributors to the field, along with their areas of focus:

Contributor	Focus	Important works
Tony Robbins	health & energy, overcoming fear, persuasion, relationships	Personal Power, "Unlimited Power" (1987)
Marcus Buckingham	strengths	First, Break All the Rules (1999)
Wayne Dyer	intention, positive thinking	The Power of Intention (2004)
Deepak Chopra	health & medicine, physics, spirituality	Quantum Healing, the Third Jesus
Stephen R. Covey	vision, alignment, prioritization, love, synergy	The 7 Habits of Highly Effective People

== Business model ==
The business models of various personal effectiveness gurus typically revolve around traditional publishing, but may also include public speaking tours, corporate bookings and/or media appearances. Recently a new trend has emerged which embraces the open-source paradigm of free content. Noteworthy open-source personal effectiveness content sites include Steve Pavlina and Level grinding.
