= Scaredy Cats =

Fantasy comedy streaming series

- Genre: Fantasy; Comedy
- Created by: Anna McRoberts
- Written by: Anna McRoberts; Eric Toth; Harland Williams; Monica Heisey; Naomi Jardine; Piers Rae
- Directed by: Anna McRoberts; Robert Vince
- Starring: Sophia Reid-Gantzert; Daphne Hoskins; Ava Augustin; Carolyn Taylor; Lauren McGibbon; Zibby Allen; Rhys Slack; Fred Ewanuick; April Amber Telek; Bill Reiter; Michael Teigen
- Theme music composer: Brahm Wenger; Gregory Prechel
- Composer: Brahm Wenger
- Country of origin: United States
- Original language: English
- No. of seasons: 1
- No. of episodes: 9

Production
- Executive producers: Anna McRoberts; Robert Vince
- Producers: Joanne Gerein; Piers Rae
- Cinematography: Mark Irwin
- Camera setup: Single-camera
- Running time: 24–46 minutes
- Production company: Air Bud Entertainment

Original release
- Network: Netflix
- Release: October 1, 2021

Scaredy Cats is a fantasy comedy children's television series created by Anna McRoberts. The series stars Sophia Reid-Gantzert, Daphne Hoskins, and Ava Augustin as Willa Ward, Scout, and Lucy, 12-year-old girls who learn about witchcraft. Other main cast members include Carolyn Taylor, Lauren McGibbon, Zibby Allen, Rhys Slack, Fred Ewanuick, April Amber Telek, Bill Reiter, and Michael Teigen. Released on October 1, 2021, on Netflix, the series has received generally positive responses.

== Synopsis ==
On her 12th birthday, Willa Ward inherits an amulet from her mother. She and her friends Scout and Lucy soon learn that it is magical and that Willa's mother had been a witch. Two bad witches Wilma and Wanda, who have been looking for the amulet for over a decade, sense it and come after Willa, seeking to create evil things. The rest of the series is all about Willa's journey to learn magic and fight the evil witches with the help of her two friends and a magic potion that turns them into cats.

== Cast ==
=== Main ===
- Sophia Reid-Gantzert as Willa Ward
- Daphne Hoskins as Lucy
- Ava Augustin as Scout
- Carolyn Taylor as Wanda
- Lauren McGibbon as Wilma
- Zibby Allen as class teacher Ms. Juniper
- Rhys Slack as Wyatt
- April Amber Telek as Sneak
- Michael Teigen as Neil Ward
- Fred Ewanuick as Sticky Paws Fink
- Bill Reiter

=== Recurring and guest ===
- Viola Abley as Blaine
- Ryan Beil as Claw
- Zahf Paroo as Principal McKay
- Rosemary Dunsmore as Winifred
- Laura Harris as Willow Ward
- Nathan Clark as Frank
- Larke Miller as Mrs. Winklepinkle
- Azriel Dalman as Sawyer

== Production and release ==
On September 7, 2021, Netflix announced Scaredy Cats as part of its "Netflix and Chills" lineup. The show is created by Anna McRoberts and Robert Vince, and was released on October 1, 2021, with episodes approximately 24–46 minutes long.

== Episodes ==
Scaredy Cats season 1 episodes
No. overall	No. in season	Title	Directed by	Written by	Original release date
1	1	"The Amulet"	Anna McRoberts	Anna McRoberts	October 1, 2021
2	2	"If the Hat Fits..."	Anna McRoberts	Harland Williams	October 1, 2021
3	3	"Mrs. Winklepinkle, Substitute Teacher"	Anna McRoberts	Eric Toth	October 1, 2021
4	4	"Adventures in Kittysitting"	Anna McRoberts and Robert Vince	Monica Heisey	October 1, 2021
5	5	"The Upside Down Classroom"	Anna McRoberts	Anna McRoberts	October 1, 2021
6	6	"Which Witch Is Which?"	Anna McRoberts	Harland Williams	October 1, 2021
7	7	"Winnifred the Wise"	Robert Vince	Naomi Jardine	October 1, 2021
8	8	"The Legend of the Witches of Winding Way"	Anna McRoberts and Robert Vince	Piers Rae	October 1, 2021
9	9	"The Halloween Howl"	Robert Vince	Anna McRoberts	October 1, 2021

== Reception ==
Reception towards the series has generally been positive. From Decider, Joel Keller praised the performances, particularly that of Reid-Gantzert and Teigen. He also commended the special effects, commenting that they are "done with care and precision". Overall, he called it a "goofy show that's definitely kid oriented. But the story is interesting enough, and the VFX are good enough, that it should keep parents engaged while their kids watch." Kanika Kumar of The Cinemaholic found it to be a "delightful children's TV show [with] the ideal mix of magic and morals", and complimented the lightheartedness and comedy as well as the topics of magic, friendship, and girl power.
