= Lilia Buckingham =

American social media influencer, actress and dancer

- Born: April 9, 2003 (age 23); Beverly Hills, California, U.S.
- Occupations: Media personality; actress; dancer; writer; producer
- Years active: 2012–present
- Family: Marcus Buckingham (father); Jane Buckingham (mother)
- Website: www.liliabuckingham.com

Lilia Buckingham (born April 9, 2003) is an American actress, internet celebrity, dancer, writer, and producer.

== Early life and education ==
Buckingham was born and raised in Beverly Hills, California, to Jane (née Rinzler) and Marcus Buckingham. She has an older brother Jack. Buckingham attended Harvard-Westlake School. She graduated from Laurel Springs School and graduated from Boston University in 2025, after studying screenwriting and film production.

== Career ==
Buckingham began acting in local musical theatre productions at the age of four. She competitively danced with the MNR Dance Factory, where she met and befriended Mackenzie and Maddie Ziegler and began to grow her online platform. Together with the Zieglers and her brother, she co-founded anti-cyberbullying organization Positively Social.

Buckingham made her television debut in 2012 with a minor role in an episode of Modern Family. She began working with Brat in 2018, starring as Autumn Miller on the web series Dirt. The character has also made appearances in other series such as Chicken Girls, Total Eclipse and Zoe Valentine, as well as the 2019 Brat film Spring Breakaway. She also made several appearances on the network's talk show, Brat Chat.

In November 2018, Buckingham and Emily Skinner released a single, "Denim Jacket", and donated a portion of the proceeds to GLAAD.

Buckingham voiced Heather Masterson, the epistolary narrator of Brat series Crown Lake, which she co-produced with Sara Shepard. Her other filmmaking work includes directing and producing a music video for Jillian Shea Spaeder's 2019 single "Something Better", which received accolades at a number of film festivals. She and Spaeder, her then-girlfriend, wrote and starred in the short film Pink.

Buckingham and Shepard went on to co-author a young adult novel, Influence, about the world of social media influencers.

In 2022, Buckingham starred in Meet Cute's series, A Pool For Love. That same year, she appeared as Cassie Traske in Hocus Pocus 2, a sequel to the 1993 film Hocus Pocus.

== Filmography ==
=== Film ===
Year	Title	Role	Notes	Ref.
2013	Good Morning America	Model	Short film	
2018	Voices	Girl	Short film	
2019	Spring Breakaway	Autumn Miller		
2020	It Counts	Lauren	Short film	
2021	Pink	Elody	Short film	
2022	Hocus Pocus 2	Cassie Traske		
2027	Jason	Madison	Post-production	

=== Television ===
Year	Title	Role	Notes	Ref.
2012	Modern Family	Trick or Treater #2	Episode: "Open House of Horrors"	
2018	Chicken Girls	Autumn Miller	Recurring role (season 2)	
2018–2019	Total Eclipse	Autumn Miller	Recurring role (season 1–3)	
2018–2019	Dirt	Autumn Miller	Main role	
2018	Brat Chat	Herself	6 episodes	
2019	Zoe Valentine	Autumn Miller	Main role (season 2)	
2019–2022	Crown Lake	Heather Masterson (voice)	Main role	

=== Music videos ===
Song	Year	Artist	Notes	Ref.
"Day & Night"	2016	Johnny Orlando & Mackenzie Ziegler		
"Where Would I Be Without You"	2017	Kendall Vertes		
"Don't Keep Me Guessing"	2018	Annie LeBlanc		
"Denim Jacket"	2018	Emily Skinner		
"In Betweenin'”	2018	AUSTN		
"No Brakes"	2019	Sophie Michelle		
"Something Better"	2019	Jillian Shea Spaeder	Director	
"Alaska"	2020	Aliyah Moulden		

== Bibliography ==
- Influence (2021) ISBN 0349003564, co-written with Sara Shepard
