= Next Level (film) =

- Directed by: Ilyssa Goodman
- Written by: Byron Kavanagh
- Produced by: Kristi Kaylor; Lisa McGuire
- Starring: Lauren Orlando; Emily Skinner; Hayden Summerall; Chloe East; Brooke Butler; Ellarose Kaylor; William Simmons; Jack Vale; Teddi Mellencamp Arroyave; Jamie Grace; Chloe Lukasiak
- Production companies: Family Theater Productions; Beverly Hills Teddy Bear; The Loft Entertainment
- Release date: September 6, 2019
- Country: United States
- Language: English

Next Level is an American dance film written by Byron Kavanagh, directed by Ilyssa Goodman, and produced by Kristi Kaylor and Lisa McGuire.

== Plot ==
Teens compete for best performer at Next Level, a prestigious performing arts summer program. There, they are taught and mentored by quirky Director Bob and veteran performer Jasmine Joel, who got her start in the Next Level program.

== Cast ==
- Lauren Orlando as Kelly Hatcher
- Emily Skinner as Cindy Stallings
- Hayden Summerall as Connor Olson
- Chloe East as Lucille "Lucy" Rizzo
- Brooke Elizabeth Butler as Rebecca "Becky" Taylor
- Ellarose Kaylor as Josefina "Josie" Parker
- William Simmons as Travis Perkins
- Chloe Lukasiak as Jasmine Joel
- Jack Vale as Director Bob
- Teddi Mellencamp Arroyave as Mrs. Stallings
- Jamie Grace as Coach

== Production ==
The cast, director, writer, and producers were announced on July 24, 2018. Filming took place in July and August 2018.

== Release ==
The film was released to theatres on September 6, 2019.

== Soundtrack ==
1. "Girls Rock" performed by Kirsten Collins
2. "Lips Like Poison" performed by Elyse
3. ”Next Level Theme" performed by Elyse
4. "Angels in Los Angeles" performed by Bekah
5. "Never" performed by Sonika Vaid
6. "Lit" performed by La'Ron Hines
7. ”Pop It” performed by Allison Olsen and Gavin Magnus
8. ”Ignite” performed by Brooke Butler
9. ”Stage Is Mine” performed by Ellarose Kaylor
10. ”Rebel” performed by Lauren Orlando
11. "Back to Back" performed by Zakry Hayden
12. "Freeze" performed by Fivel Stewart feat. Booboo Stewart
13. "Well Played" performed by Elyse
14. "Girls Talk Too Much" performed by Elyse
15. "Energy" performed by The Merge
16. ”What We Do” performed by Ellarose Kaylor
17. ”Who I Am” performed by Brooke Butler
18. "Let Me Know" performed by Elyse
19. ”Live The Dream” performed by Emily Skinner
20. ”Special Place” performed by Lauren Orlando (written by Daniel Jacobson/Eric Johnson)
21. "Thinking About You" performed by Johnny Orlando
22. "In The City" performed by Zakry Hayden
23. ”Dance It Off” performed by Reese Herron and Ellarose Kaylor
24. ”Spotlight” performed by Kirsten Collins
25. "Wando" performed by Andrew Lane
26. "Beat" performed by Andrew Lane
27. "Coral Reef" performed by Summer
28. "Worst Best Friend" performed by The Merge
29. ”Admit It” performed by Hayden Summerall
30. "Wait All Day" performed by Allison Olsen
