= One Too Many Mornings (disambiguation) =

One Too Many Mornings may refer to:

- "One Too Many Mornings," a 1964 song by Bob Dylan
- One Too Many Mornings (film), a 2009 independent comedy film
- "One Too Many Mornings," a song by The Chemical Brothers appearing on their 1993 EP Fourteenth Century Sky and 1995 album Exit Planet Dust
