= Everybody Wants You (Johnny Orlando song) =

Single by Johnny Orlando

from the EP It's Never Really Over
- Released: September 10, 2020
- Recorded: June 2020
- Length: 3:23
- Label: Universal
- Songwriter(s): Pomeranz, Dussaigne, Finkeistein
- Producer(s): POM POM

Johnny Orlando singles chronology
"See You" (2020)	"Everybody Wants You" (2020)	"Last Christmas" (2020)

Music video
- "Everybody Wants You" on YouTube

Everybody Wants You is a song by Canadian singer Johnny Orlando. It was released on September 10, 2020, as a single from his third EP It's Never Really Over.

== Background ==
Orlando leaked his 15-second video singing on his electric guitar which was later a hint for his forthcoming EP on his Instagram account last July 17, 2020, stating his caption: "soo wants new music¿"

The song title was officially revealed on his Instagram live last August 2020, but some rumors say that the title leaked posted on his Instagram stories doing his carpool with his fans, then gave more internet attention that he will release his single next month.

The background of the song was in dedication to his father who was his inspiration on behind tracks as his supportive mentor in his career, another statement is about a five-year-old kid sitting alone at the bench which he saw on his purpose in the first verse but some other people know when to get through and knowing he was about to drive a car after school but catches a kid to find a way home. Also, Orlando first used the explicit word meaning, they are a metaphor for clearing his mind while writing his music.

== Music video ==
The music video was shot in Toronto on September 2, 2020. The video was directed by Alex Smith and coordinated with animations by Gabe Sapienza. The locations were shot in Polson Pier. He stated that the shooting of the video was late at night and that shots of him driving around may not appear to have context however they are based on personal self-reflection.

== Charts ==
Chart (2020–2021)	Peak position
Canada (Canadian Hot 100)	61
Canada AC (Billboard)	14
Canada CHR/Top 40 (Billboard)	20
Canada Hot AC (Billboard)	14

== Certifications ==
Certifications for "Everybody Wants You"
Region	Certification	Certified units/sales
Canada (Music Canada)	Gold	40,000^{‡}
^{‡} Sales+streaming figures based on certification alone.

== Release history ==
Region	Date	Format	Label
Various	September 10, 2020	Digital download; streaming	Universal Music Canada
Canada	September 18, 2020	Contemporary hit radio	Universal
Various	October 2020 (SHIFT K3Y Remix)	Digital download; streaming	Universal
Various	January 2021 (Acoustic Version)	Digital download; streaming	Universal
