= She Dances =

2025 American comedy-drama film

- Theatrical release poster
- Directed by: Rick Gomez
- Written by: Rick Gomez; Steve Zahn
- Produced by: Rick Gomez; Mandi Reno; Jenifer Westphal; Steve Zahn; Coby Toland; Jason Reed
- Starring: Steve Zahn; Ethan Hawke; Sonequa Martin-Green; Mackenzie Ziegler; Rosemarie DeWitt; Audrey Zahn
- Cinematography: David Morrison
- Edited by: Coby Toland
- Music by: Joshua Gomez
- Production companies: Macaroni Art Productions; Wavelength
- Distributed by: EKKL Entertainment
- Release dates: June 5, 2025 (Tribeca); March 27, 2026 (United States)
- Running time: 93 minutes
- Country: United States
- Language: English

She Dances is a 2025 American comedy drama film directed by Rick Gomez in his directorial debut, from a screenplay by Gomez and Steve Zahn. It stars Zahn, Ethan Hawke, Sonequa Martin-Green, Mackenzie Ziegler, Rosemarie DeWitt and Audrey Zahn.

The film had its world premiere at Tribeca Festival on June 5, 2025, and was released in the United States on March 27, 2026.

== Premise ==
A struggling father attempts to reconnect with his daughter while serving as her chaperone at a dance competition.

== Cast ==
- Steve Zahn as Jason
- Ethan Hawke as Brian
- Sonequa Martin-Green as Jamie
- Mackenzie Ziegler as Kat
- Rosemarie DeWitt as Deb
- Audrey Zahn as Claire

== Production ==
In March 2024, it was announced Steve Zahn, Ethan Hawke, Sonequa Martin-Green, Rosemarie DeWitt and Audrey Zahn had joined the cast of the film, with Rick Gomez directing from a screenplay he co-wrote alongside Zahn. Zahn and Gomez serve as producers under their Macaroni Art Productions banner.

Principal photography took place in Kentucky.

== Release ==
It had its world premiere at the 2025 Tribeca Festival on June 5, 2025. The film was released in the United States on March 27, 2026.

== Reception ==
On review aggregator Rotten Tomatoes, 89% of 28 critics gave the film a positive review, with an average rating of 6.7/10.

Christian Zilko of IndieWire found the "performances are enough to salvage the film," highlighting Audrey Zahn's "fantastic debut performance."

Tomris Laffly of Variety complimented the pairing of Steve and Audrey Zahn but found that the "stilted writing and direction" led to awkward dialogue and interactions.
