= Emily Skinner (actress, born 2002) =

American actress

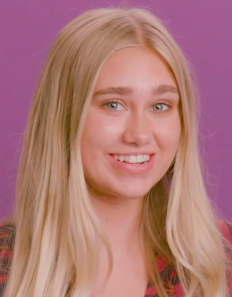
- Skinner in 2019
- Born: Emily Noelle Skinner; November 30, 2002 (age 23); Mission Viejo, California, U.S.
- Occupation: Actress
- Years active: 2009–present

Emily Noelle Skinner (born November 30, 2002) is an American actress. She is known for her work with the Brat network (2018–2020) and her role as Amber on the Disney Channel series Andi Mack (2017–2019).

== Early and personal life ==
Skinner was born Emily Noelle Skinner in Mission Viejo, California, and was raised in Trabuco Canyon, California. Her parents are Jennifer and Steve, and she has an older sister, Lauren.

She has supported and been involved in charity and activism, including the Make-A-Wish Foundation, Mattel Children's Hospital, Time's Up, and the March for Our Lives.

== Career ==
Skinner began acting at the age of six, when she was enrolled into an acting class, and she later signed with Abrams Artists Agency. Her first role was in a 2009 episode of NUMB3RS.

In 2010, Skinner starred as one of the leads in short film Sodales, directed by Jessica Biel, which was a part of Glamour Magazine's "Reel Moments". She has also had several guest roles on television shows including Shake it Up, Days of Our Lives, CSI: Crime Scene Investigation, Austin & Ally, The Mindy Project, Sam & Cat, Criminal Minds, Rizzoli & Isles, and more. In 2015, she appeared in the music video for "Broken Arrows", an Avicii song. She starred in her first theatrical film, Blood Ransom, in 2014.

Skinner landed her first major role as Amber on the Disney Channel series Andi Mack, which premiered in 2017. She auditioned for the roles of Andi, Buffy, and Amber, and participated in a chemistry read with Peyton Elizabeth Lee and Asher Angel. In 2018, Skinner began working with the Brat network. Her roles include Diana in Total Eclipse and Chloe in Crown Lake. She has also made an appearance in the network's talk show, Brat Chat. In November 2018, she and Lilia Buckingham released a single, "Denim Jacket" and donated a portion of the proceeds to GLAAD.

Skinner starred as Cindy Stallings in the 2019 dance film, Next Level. She appeared in another MarVista film Secrets in the Water as well as the Lifetime television film Saving My Daughter. She has upcoming roles in The Lies I Tell Myself, Something's More Than One Thing, and #FBF.

== Filmography ==
=== Film ===
Year	Title	Role	Notes
2009	The Swimming Lesson	Jenny	Short film
2010	Sodales	Shannon	Short film
2010	Eternity Road	Aria	Short film
2014	Blood Ransom	Emily Hudson	
2019	Next Level	Cindy Stallings	
2020	Secrets in the Water	Bailey	
2020	It Counts	Stella	Short film
2023	#FBF	Lindsey	
2024	Something's More Than One Thing	Nikki	
2024	Spin the Bottle	Carleen	
2026	Missouri	Missouri	
2026	The Gentleman Thief	Violet	
TBA	The Lies I Tell Myself	Katie	

=== Television ===
Year	Title	Role	Notes
2009	Numbers	Cynthia Jane Bramon (CJ)	Episode: "Hydra"
2010	Keeping Up with the Guptas	Katie	TV movie
2010	CSI: Crime Scene Investigation	Alise Jones	Episode: "Sqweegel"
2011	Shake it Up	Sally Van Buren	Episode: "Glitz it Up"
2011	Days of Our Lives	Kim Marston	1 episode
2011	Five	Sally	TV movie
2011	Austin & Ally	Mad Dog	Episode: "Kangaroos & Chaos"
2012	Man Up!	Tess	Episode: "Letting Go"
2013	The Mindy Project	Janie	Episode: "Triathlon"
2013	Sam & Cat	Chloe	3 episodes
2013	Criminal Minds	Julie Hoover	Episode: "The Return"
2015	Wet Hot American Summer: First Day of Camp	Froggy	2 episodes
2016	Angel from Hell	11 Year Old Allison	Episode: "Funsgiving"
2016	Rizzoli & Isles	Wendy Sokoloff	Episode: "Yesterday, Today, Tomorrow"
2017–2019	Andi Mack	Amber	Recurring role; 24 episodes
2021	Saving My Daughter	Chloe	TV movie

=== Web ===
Year	Title	Role	Notes
2018–2020	Total Eclipse	Diana	Main role
2018	Brat Chat	Herself	1 episode
2018	Brat Holiday Spectacular	Diana	Brat holiday special
2019–2020	Crown Lake	Chloe Hauser	Main role (seasons 1–2)

=== Music videos ===
Song	Year	Artist	Notes
"Broken Arrows"	2015	Avicii	
"Only Human"	2016	Ty Waters	
"Denim Jacket"	2018	Emily & Lilia	
"Phobias"	2020	Johnny Orlando	
