= MTV Europe Music Award for Best Canadian Act =

Category of MTV Europe Music Awards

The following is a list of the MTV Europe Music Award winners and nominees for Best Canadian Act.

== Winners and nominees ==
Winners are listed first and highlighted in bold.

=== 2010s ===
Year	Artist	Ref
2013
2013	**Justin Bieber**	
2013	Deadmau5	
2013	Drake	
2013	Tegan and Sara	
2013	The Weeknd	
2013	Pre-nominations: Metric; Serena Ryder; TR/ST	
2014
2014	**Justin Bieber**	
2014	Arcade Fire	
2014	Drake	
2014	Kiesza	
2014	Avril Lavigne	
2014	Pre-nominations: Hedley; Tegan and Sara; The Weeknd	
2015
2015	**Justin Bieber**	
2015	The Weeknd	
2015	Carly Rae Jepsen	
2015	Drake	
2015	Shawn Mendes	
2015	Pre-nominations: Alessia Cara; Keys N Krates; Lights	
2016
2016	**Justin Bieber**	
2016	Alessia Cara	
2016	Drake	
2016	Shawn Mendes	
2016	The Weeknd	
2017
2017	**Shawn Mendes**	
2017	Alessia Cara	
2017	Drake	
2017	Justin Bieber	
2017	The Weeknd	
2018
2018	**Shawn Mendes**	
2018	Alessia Cara	
2018	Arcade Fire	
2018	Drake	
2018	The Weeknd	
2019
2019	**Johnny Orlando**	
2019	Shawn Mendes	
2019	Avril Lavigne	
2019	Carly Rae Jepsen	
2019	Alessia Cara	

=== 2020s ===
Year	Artist	Ref
2020
2020	**Johnny Orlando**	
2020	Alessia Cara	
2020	The Weeknd	
2020	Justin Bieber	
2020	Jessie Reyez	
2021
2021	**Johnny Orlando**	
2021	Justin Bieber	
2021	Shawn Mendes	
2021	The Weeknd	
2021	Tate McRae	
2022
2022	**Johnny Orlando**	
2022	Avril Lavigne	
2022	Drake	
2022	Tate McRae	
2022	The Weeknd	
2023
2023	**Shania Twain**	
2023	Charlotte Cardin	
2023	Drake	
2023	Jamie Fine	
2023	The Beaches	
2024
2024	**Shawn Mendes**	
2024	AR Paisley	
2024	Kaytranada	
2024	Nelly Furtado	
2024	Tate McRae	

== See also ==
- MTV VMA International Viewer's Choice Award for MTV Canada
