= Errol Sadler =

American film producer (born 1982)

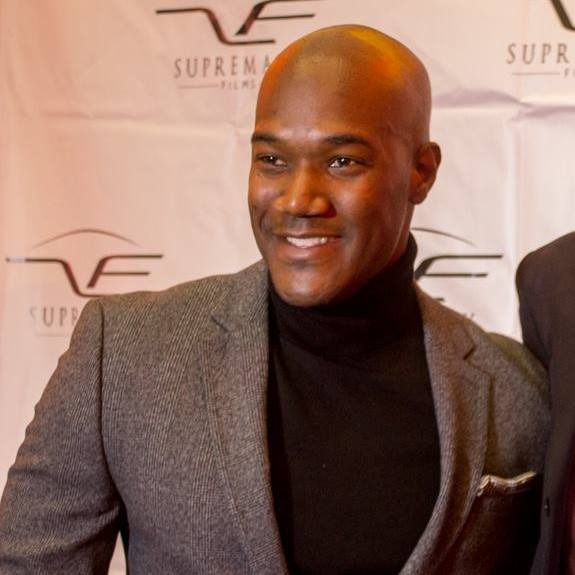
- Sadler at private screening of Curve Ball in Atlanta, Georgia
- Born: September 16, 1982 (age 42); Kingston, Jamaica
- Occupation(s): Producer, entrepreneur

Errol Sadler (born September 16, 1982) is an American film producer. Sadler is the founder-CEO of Supremacy Films, an Atlanta, Georgia-based film production company that specializes in the development, packaging, financing and production of independent films. Sadler also works closely with Brandon Thaxton on numerous film productions in the Atlanta area.

== Career ==
In 2009, Sadler made his producer debut with “Eros”, a short dramatic thriller dealing with the repercussions of love, lies and deception. An instant success, it received a Comcast On-demand distribution deal. Sadler then partnered with Last Looks Inc. to produce four short films “Up in Smoke" starring Brad James as Chase, “No Crime”, “Letters to a Father" starring Jasmine Burke, and “Prognosis”, a story about Marcus Ford whose prognosis sends him into a violent spiraling frenzy. This dramatic action short featured Doris Morgado, Dwayne Boyd, and Valerie Sue Love These films have been part of numerous film festivals such as the Atlanta Black Film Festival (ABFF), Brooklyn Short Film Festival (BSFF), Long Island Film Festival (LIFF), Manhattan Film Festival (MIFF), Peachtree Village International Film Festival (PVIFF), and the Women in Film and Television (WIFTA).

His partnership with Reel One Entertainment, an Atlanta-based production company, stemmed the action packed film BlackHats. He produced and starred as Elisha beside Doris Morgado. Elisha was a reformed, hot-tempered bounty hunter, who finds his new harmonious life as a fugitive recovery agent threatened. Next Sadler produced Curveball featuring Lynn Whitfield and Rockmond Dunbar. Curveball is the coming-of-age story of a boy named Nolan as he faces several challenges in his life which he must learn to conquer without the help of his mother or counselor.

Joining forces with Symmetry Entertainment and C. Clear Cinema, Sadler produced Echo At 11 Oak Drive, a feature-length film of three stories that transpire under the same roof during three different eras of time: 1951, 1973, and 2010. It was screened at Sundance in 2013 and received great reviews. He has several projects pending, "Echoes", a short of the same story line was accepted into the 2013 Cannes Film Festival and is pending a distribution deal. Partnering again with Reel One Entertainment an untitled boxing film was slated to start principal photography in 2017. Sadler and Shadow Motion Picture, a Los Angeles-based production company, are slated to produce the feature-length film Fixer based on the sisterhood of female assassins. A deal with director R.L. Scott is in the works to produce an action-packed boxing flick.

== Filmography ==
Crew
Year	Title	Role	Notes
2018	Love Spell	Producer	Movie
2018	Beauty and the Beholder	Producer	Movie
	The Focal Point	Producer	Movie
2017	Inside Vault	Producer	Movie
2017	Walk Away from Love	Co-producer	Movie
2015	Across the Tracks	Producer	Short
2015	Curveball	Executive producer / Producer	Movie
2015	Blackhats	Producer	Movie
2014	The Fuller View	Producer	TV series
2014	The Killing Secret	Producer	Movie
2013	Horror Hotel: The Webseries	Co-producer	TV series
2013	Prognosis	Executive producer	Short
2012	A Beary Scary Movie	Executive producer	Movie
2012	Echo at 11 Oak Drive	Co-producer	Movie
2011	Checkmate	Producer	Short
2011	Letters to a Father	Co-producer	Short
2011	Templeton Pride	Co-producer	TV series
2011	Eros	Producer	Short
2010	This Time	Co-producer	Short
2024	Popular Theory	Producer	Movie

Cast
Year	Title	Role	Notes
2015	Blackhats	Elisha	Movie
2011	Eros	Detective Cooper	Short
2011	Step Off	Maestro	Movie
2010	Meet the Browns	Assistant Coach	TV series
2009	Pastor Brown	Church Member	Movie
