= Michael Mohan =

American director

Michael Mohan (born in Boston, Massachusetts) is an American director, best known for directing Immaculate. He was nominated for a Daytime Emmy Award for Outstanding Directing For A Children's Series for Ghostwriter.

== Filmography ==
Short film

Year	Title	Director	Writer
2003	Trick	Yes	Yes
2004	La dentista	Yes	Yes
2006	Initiation	Yes	Yes
2007	Casual Encounters	Yes	Yes
2011	Ex-Sex	Yes	Yes
2013	This Is How You Die	Yes	Yes
2015	Pink Grapefruit	Yes	Yes

Feature film

Year	Title	Director	Writer
2010	One Too Many Mornings	Yes	Yes
2012	Save the Date	Yes	Yes
2017	People You May Know	No	Story
2021	The Voyeurs	Yes	Yes
2024	Immaculate	Yes	No
TBA	An Innocent Girl	No	Yes

Television

Year	Title	Director	Writer	Creator	Executive producer	Notes
2018	Everything Sucks!	Yes	Yes	Yes	Yes	Directed 7 episodes
2019	Ghostwriter	Yes	No	No	No	Episode "The Jungle Ghost"

== Accolades ==
Year	Award	Category	Title	Result	Ref.
2020	Daytime Emmy Awards	Outstanding Directing for a Children's or Young Adult Program	Ghostwriter	Nominated	
