= Popular Theory =

2024 film by Ali Scher

- Theatrical release poster
- Directed by: Ali Scher
- Written by: Ali Scher; Joe Swanson
- Produced by: Christian Hall; Errol Sadler; Ali Scher; Camilo Diaz Caro; Aidan Guthrie
- Starring: Sophia Reid-Gantzert; Chloe East; Cheryl Hines; Marc Evan Jackson
- Production company: Two Independent Eyes Productions
- Distributed by: Blue Fox Entertainment
- Release date: February 9, 2024
- Running time: 100 minutes
- Country: United States
- Language: English
- Box office: $37,543

Popular Theory is a 2024 American family film directed by Ali Scher. The film stars Sophia Reid-Gantzert, Lincoln Lambert, Chloe East and Cheryl Hines.

== Cast ==
- Sophia Reid-Gantzert as Erwin Page
- Lincoln Lambert as Winston Wilkinson
- Kat Conner Sterling as Casey
- Chloe East as Ari Page
- Cheryl Hines as Tammy Page
- Marc Evan Jackson as Arthur Page
- Eugenie Bondurant as Mrs. Cornbee

== Production ==
It was announced that filming had wrapped on September 1, 2022.

== Release ==
In 2022, it was announced that Blue Fox Entertainment acquired the rights to the film.

Popular Theory was released in theaters in the United States on February 9, 2024.

== Reception ==
On the review aggregator website Rotten Tomatoes, 67% of 6 critics' reviews are positive, with an average rating of 6.9/10.
