= Sophia Reid-Gantzert =

Canadian actress and dancer

- Born: January 18, 2010 (age 16); Port Coquitlam, British Columbia, Canada
- Occupations: Actress; dancer
- Years active: 2017–present

Sophia Reid-Gantzert (born January 18, 2010) is a Canadian actress and dancer. She began dancing at age two and won a competition in Austria at age six. In 2017, she made her acting debut in the television film The Sweetest Christmas. Reid-Gantzert received critical praise for her performance as Karen Brewer in Netflix's The Baby-Sitters Club (2020–2021). She later played lead roles in the comedy series Scaredy Cats (2021) and the coming-of-age film Popular Theory (2024).

== Early life ==
Sophia Reid-Gantzert was born on January 18, 2010, to Kerri-Ann and René Gantzert, the youngest of six children; she is from Port Coquitlam. Reid-Gantzert attended Encore Dance Academy from the age of two. She transferred to Caulfield School of Dance in September 2014 to study jazz, musical theatre, and ballet. At the age of six, she won the Vienna International Ballet Experience, a competition in Austria, in the division of solo dancers age seven and under. Reid-Gantzert has also trained at the Paris Opera Ballet and Danceworks Ballet Academy. As of 2016, she studied at Meadowridge School in Maple Ridge, British Columbia.

== Career ==
Reid-Gantzert first appeared onscreen in 2017 television film The Sweetest Christmas as Harper. In 2020, she played the recurring role of Karen Brewer, the outspoken and strange daughter of Watson Brewer, in Netflix's The Baby-Sitters Club. The series, and its performances, garnered critical praise. From The Hollywood Reporter, Robyn Bahr found her to be a theatrical standout, while The Hindu said she portrayed the role "with complete gusto"; Alexis Gunderson of Paste listed the series' entire cast as one of the best performances of 2020, singling out Reid-Gantzert's "deliciously unhinged take on Karen Brewer, which will haunt [her] (in the best, most hilarious way) for the rest of [her] life".

In October 2021, Reid-Gantzert led the cast of the Netflix comedy series Scaredy Cats as Willa Ward, a girl who discovers she is a witch on her 12th birthday. Decider's Joel Keller regarded her performance as smart, real, and "slotted right in between precocious and silly"; Common Sense Media writer Joly Herman disagreed, considering the acting "less-than-great". That same month, The Baby-Sitters Club's second season was released, to positive reviews. Paste's Kaitlin Thomas praised Reid-Gantzert's performance, opining she "confidently delivers her lines in a way that belies her young age". Reid-Gantzert also appeared as Lily Lassiter Psych 3: This Is Gus, released in November. In the HBO Max film 8-Bit Christmas (2021), she portrayed Annie Doyle, for which Los Angeles Times applauded her "excellent timing". In 2024, Reid-Gantzert starred in the coming-of-age comedy film Popular Theory and appeared in the Hulu's mystery drama show Death and Other Details.

== Filmography ==
=== Film ===
| Year | Title | Role | Notes |
|---|---|---|---|
| 2021 | 8-Bit Christmas | Annie Doyle | |
| 2022 | Holiday Harmony | Sarah | |
| 2024 | Popular Theory | Erwin Page | |

=== Television ===
| Year | Title | Role | Notes |
|---|---|---|---|
| 2017 | The Sweetest Christmas | Harper | Television film |
| 2017 | Once Upon a Time | Young Anastasia | Episode: "One Little Tear" |
| 2018 | Darrow & Darrow: In the Key of Murder | Sarah Wylkes | Television film |
| 2019 | Easter Under Wraps | Madison Bailey | Television film |
| 2020–2021 | The Baby-Sitters Club | Karen Brewer | Recurring; 11 episodes |
| 2021 | Scaredy Cats | Willa Ward | Lead role; 9 episodes |
| 2021 | Psych 3: This Is Gus | Lily Lassiter | Television film |
| 2022 | Two Sentence Horror Stories | Angela Manderley | Episode: "Teatime" |
| 2024 | Death and Other Details | Young Imogen | Recurring; 4 episodes |
| 2026 | Free Bert | Kiersten Vanderthal | |
