= Jane Buckingham =

American author and businesswoman

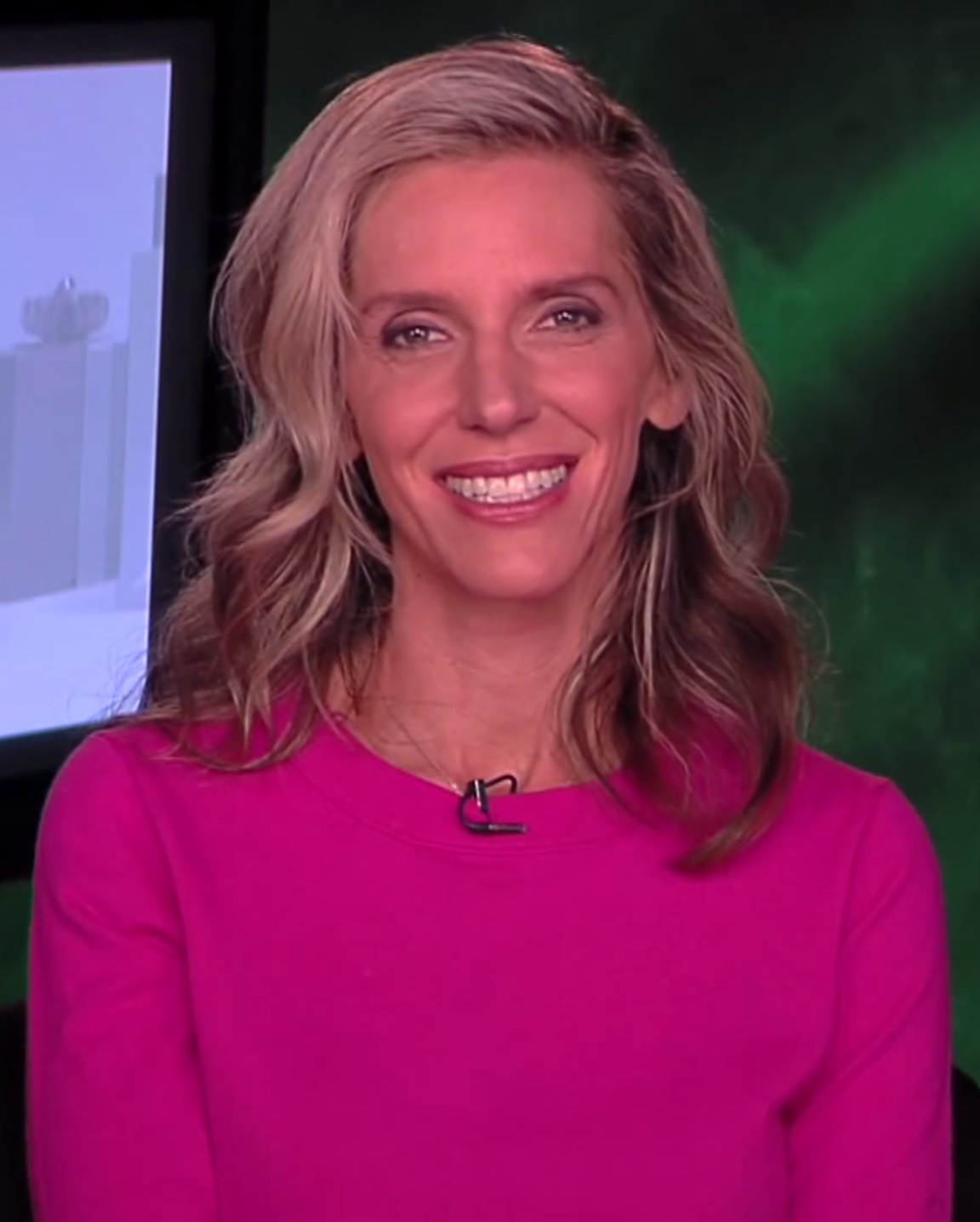
- Buckingham interviewed in 2015
- Born: Jane Ruth Rinzler; 1968 (age 57–58); New York City, New York
- Education: Duke University (BA)
- Occupations: Author, businesswoman
- Notable work: The Modern Girl's Guide to Life; What's Next
- Spouse: Marcus Buckingham (m. 1996; div. 2017)
- Children: 2, including Lilia Buckingham
- Website: www.janebuckingham.com

Jane Ruth Buckingham (née Rinzler; born 1968) is an American author and businesswoman who founded the consumer insights firm Trendera. She is known for writing "The Modern Girl's Guide to Life" book series, which spawned the television series of the same name. She was convicted in the 2019 college admissions bribery scandal.

== Early career ==
At the age of 16, Buckingham wrote the book Teens Speak Out, a report from teens on their most intimate thoughts, feelings and hopes for the future. After working in advertising at BBDO New York, FCB/Leber Katz New York and Houston Effler Boston, she started her own youth-focused trend-forecasting firm, Youth Intelligence, in 1996.

== Career ==
=== Youth Intelligence ===
Youth Intelligence is a youth-focused consumer insights company that focuses on "Generations X and Y" (i.e. ages 14–39). While running Youth Intelligence, Buckingham published The Cassandra Report, a trend forecasting study used by large companies. The company worked with clients including Chanel, Fox Broadcasting, MTV, Levis, and Procter & Gamble. In 2003, Buckingham sold Youth Intelligence to the Los Angeles based talent and sports agency Creative Artists Agency.

=== The Modern Girl's Guide to Life ===
Buckingham wrote The Modern Girls Guide to Life (Regan, 2004), The Modern Girl’s Guide to Motherhood (Collins, 2006) and The Modern Girls Guide to Sticky Situations (Collins, 2010). She has addressed subjects including parenting tips in the series, and predictions about the future for businesses in What's Next. The Modern Girls Guide book series was turned into a television series that ran for 36 episodes for the Style Network in 2003. The show was hosted by Buckingham along with Eva LaRue, Claudia Jordan and Jess Zaino.

=== Trendera ===
Buckingham left the Intelligence Group in 2009 to start Trendera, a trend forecasting, consulting, research, and multi media company. Buckingham consults companies and individuals to help them reach out to diverse age groups.

== Press, film, and television appearances ==
Buckingham has been the subject of in-depth profiles in The Los Angeles Times, The Boston Globe, 60 Minutes, and Good Morning America. She has appeared on numerous programs including, The Today Show and The Oprah Winfrey Show, and The View. Additionally, Buckingham has been a keynote speaker and panelist at events such as ASME, SIMA, and BlogHer., and L2.

Buckingham is currently a contributing editor at Glamour, and The Huffington Post, and makes regular appearances on Good Morning America and The View.

== College admissions scandal conviction ==
Buckingham was arrested on March 12, 2019, for participation in a college admissions bribery scandal. Buckingham, acting without her son's knowledge or consent, donated $50,000 to the college counseling firm Key Worldwide Foundation to arrange for a proctor to take the ACT on her son's behalf. Buckingham provided the proctor with a sample of her son's writing to emulate and had her son take a practice ACT in order to have him believe he had actually taken the test. In April, Buckingham agreed to plead guilty.

On October 23, 2019, U.S. District Court Judge Indira Talwani sentenced Buckingham to 21 days in prison, a $40,000 fine, and one year of supervised release. However, the U.S. Attorney's Office sought a sentence of six months in prison, saying Buckingham was "more deeply engaged in the mechanics of the fraud than many of the other parents" in the case. By having a proctor take the test on her son's behalf, they said, she deprived him "of even the opportunity to get any of the answers right on his own."

== Personal life ==
Jane and Marcus Buckingham married in 1996 and divorced in 2017. They have a son, Jack, and a daughter, Lilia, who is an actress on the Brat network.

=== Political views ===
In 2019, Buckingham hosted in her home, and later co-hosted, California fundraisers for U.S. Senator Kirsten Gillibrand's 2020 exploratory Presidential campaign, and has been a "major donor" to various Democratic political candidates.
