= Total Eclipse (web series) =

American web series produced by Brat

- Also known as: School of drama
- Genre: Teen drama; Comedy; Fantasy
- Created by: Meg Favreau
- Directed by: Jeff Jenkins; Chris Campbell
- Starring: Mackenzie Ziegler; Lauren Orlando; Emily Skinner; Nadia Turner; Devenity Perkins; Johnny Orlando; Darius Marcell; Mike Lane; Bryce Xavier; Isaak Presley
- Country of origin: United States
- Original language: English
- No. of seasons: 5
- No. of episodes: 49

Production
- Executive producers: Rob Fishman; Darren Latchman
- Camera setup: Single-camera
- Running time: 8–17 minutes
- Production company: Brat

Original release
- Network: YouTube
- Release: April 5, 2018 – September 3, 2020

Total Eclipse is an American teen drama television series starring Mackenzie Ziegler, Lauren Orlando, Johnny Orlando, Emily Skinner, Nadia Turner, Devenity Perkins, and Darius Marcell. The series is produced by digital network Brat and premiered on April 5, 2018, on Brat's YouTube channel. It follows a group of high school students and sheds light on common themes among teens such as bullying and relationships, including friendships, cliques, and romances. The protagonist Cassie, played by Ziegler, is cast out of her childhood friend circle and seeks to re-establish those friendships, make new friends, and negotiate social situations at school and in her community.

== Synopsis ==
=== Season 1 ===
At Millwood High, Cassie is a teenager who was ditched by her childhood friends Diana, Morgan, and Jenna. To cope with their bullying, she dreams of a world where she is an astronaut on the Moon, a fantasy that she and her friends had devised as children. Cassie is loyal to her friends even after some of them betray her, like when Diana embarrasses Cassie by publicly revealing copies of Cassie's private drawings.

Cassie initially befriends Kate to win back her former friends but later warms up to her. Their friendship is complicated because of Cassie's reciprocated interest in Kate's brother, Sam. Jenna, whose parents have a difficult marriage, also has a crush on Sam and kisses him, but tells him to keep it a secret. Kate bonds with Luca, a witchcraft-practicing boy at the shop she works, who later develops feelings for her.

=== Season 2 ===
Diana starts to imagine herself as a princess in her own world. Cassie and Sam briefly grapple with their crushes on each other, to Kate's dismay. Later, Morgan leaves Diana's group, and Kate distances herself from Luca and his witchcraft. Meanwhile, Jenna steals clothing from Perry's stepmother's store. Cassie, witnessing the shoplifting, takes the blame to preserve Jenna’s relationship with her boyfriend. Cassie breaks up with Sam and wants to date Julian, a crush from her dance class before she finds out that Diana has reached Julian first. Jenna's situation at home starts to worsen, and she reveals that she escapes into her own world where she is the superhero.

=== Season 3 ===
The girls imagine from time to time that they are in their own world. Luca offers to produce a song for Sam. Kate and Sam's ailing aunt, Bonnie, moves in with their family and dies soon after. Cassie tries to help Sam and Kate cope with the death of their aunt, and Sam and Cassie grow closer again. Sam and Kate grieve at home for some time but when they return to school, they learn that Luca has taken credit for Sam's song. Sam confronts Luca who later apologizes to Sam and the two make amends. The history teacher, Ms. Dawson, takes out old frustrations by singling Cassie out, lying, and changing test scores to undermine her academic career. Morgan joins the experimental film club to please her boyfriend Eli, but she quits when he pressures her to choose between the club and her other friends. Ms. Dawson befriends and manipulates Jenna to alienate her from the other girls, and then tries to use her as a weapon against them. Cassie, Diana, and Morgan are suspended, supposedly for cheating in history and skipping Spanish as the vice-principal, Mr. Lane believes Ms. Dawson, who is manipulating him romantically. Cassie and Diana rekindle their friendship through their efforts to reveal Ms. Dawson's unethical behavior. Morgan’s older sister, Jasmine, who was Ms. Dawson's classmate, helps Cassie and Diana discover and reveal Ms. Dawson's real identity and dishonesty. Mr. Lane finally believes the girls and has Ms. Dawson removed. At the end of season 3, Sam and Cassie are seen holding hands and appear to share a kiss. They kiss and realize that they are meant for each other, but Cassie tells Kate that they are not a couple. Cassie, Kate, Diana, Jenna, and Morgan all become friends.

=== Season 4 ===
There is a new counselor named Mr. James. Magic Moves closes down and there is a new boy at Millwood named Axel. Jenna immediately falls for him, but he seems to be playing games with Jenna and Diana. Sam goes away leaving a note saying he was going to go to the conservatory, but he was not actually accepted. Cassie, Diana, Kate, Morgan, and Jenna get into a fight until Belle stops them when she reveals that she and Axel are dating and Axel had been playing them. Cassie, Diana, Kate, Morgan, and Jenna make a pact to never let a boy ruin their friendship.

=== Season 5 ===
The girls have plans for the summer. Cassie works in The Parlor during the summer to save up to audition for the dance conservatory while Jenna works at Tres Chic. Kate promotes her eating healthy food video which Morgan helps her film. They help keep Junior’s customers from The Parlor, as the two are rivals, but they all sort it out in the end. This strains Morgan, Kate, and Cassie's friendship, but they make up when Cassie helps Junior's by delivering them fruit. Meanwhile, Diana attends summer school along with Sam, meets a boy named Marley, and learns something about him that makes her think about her past. Additionally, Jenna and Spencer become a couple and Portia, Marley, and Jerry are introduced.

== Cast ==
- Mackenzie Ziegler as Cassandra "Cassie" Gordon
- Lauren Orlando as Kate Parker
- Emily Skinner as Diana
- Nadia Turner as Jenna Waterson
- Devenity Perkins as Morgan
- Johnny Orlando as Sam Parker
- Darius Marcell as Spencer
- Mike Lane as Mr. Lane
- Bryce Xavier as Scott (seasons 2–3)
- Isaak Presley as Axel (seasons 4-5)

=== Recurring ===
- Lilia Buckingham as Autumn Miller (seasons 1–3)
- Dominic Kline as Brayden (seasons 1–2)
- Samuel Parker as Eli (seasons 1–4)
- Grant Knoche as Jules (season 1)
- Paityn Hart as Georgia (seasons 1-2)
- Logan Pepper as Luca (seasons 2–3)
- Steffan Argus as Julian (seasons 2–3)
- Heather Woodward as Felicity (seasons 2–3)
- Lisa Maley as Ms. Dawson (season 3)
- Paul Arnold as Junior Chambers (seasons 4-5)
- Lisette Alexis as Belle (season 4)
- Will Simmons as Marley (season 5)
- Sage Rosen as Jerry (season 5)
- Sawyer Fuller as Portia (season 5)
- Michelle Bernard as Randi Roach (season 5)

== Episodes ==
Season	Episodes	Originally released	
Season	Episodes	First released	Last released
1	10	April 5, 2018	June 7, 2018
2	11	September 6, 2018	November 22, 2018
3	10	March 21, 2019	May 23, 2019
4	10	September 5, 2019	November 7, 2019
5	8	July 16, 2020	September 3, 2020

=== Season 1 (2018) ===
No. overall	No. in season	Title	Original release date
1	1	"Moonrise"	April 5, 2018
Cassie’s world is shaken up by a new arrival in Millwood.
2	2	"New Moon"	April 12, 2018
When their class is assigned a group project, Cassie sees an opportunity to get closer to Kate.
3	3	"Waxing Crescent"	April 19, 2018
Embarrassed by an old photo, Diana vows to get revenge.
4	4	"First Quarter"	April 26, 2018
It's party night at Diana’s, but not everyone is in for a good time.
5	5	"Waxing Gibbous"	May 3, 2018
Cassie deals with the aftermath of the party, but she's not the only one upset with Diana.
6	6	"Full Moon"	May 10, 2018
When Kate casts a love spell, the girls’ relationships start to change.
7	7	"Waning Gibbous"	May 17, 2018
Sam and Kate invite friends over on the same night.
8	8	"Last Quarter"	May 24, 2018
Brayden sets his sights on a new crush.
9	9	"Waning Crescent"	May 31, 2018
The girls prepare for the upcoming talent show.
10	10	"Moonset"	June 7, 2018
At the talent show, not all of the drama stays on stage.

=== Season 2 (2018) ===
No. overall	No. in season	Title	Original release date
11	1	"Thangs"	September 6, 2018
Mr. Lane assigns Cassie dance as her extracurricular to get her out of her comfort zone. Diana decides that she is going to date Scott, who has returned from the summer looking better than ever. When Kate realizes Brayden doesn't know that they are broken up, she must take matters into her own hands.
12	2	"Solar Eclipse"	September 13, 2018
Secrets are revealed when Sam invites Cassie over to watch the eclipse together. Meanwhile, with Diana and Morgan being kicked off the cheerleading squad, they are forced to find new extra-curriculars.
13	3	"The Princess Needs A Prince"	September 20, 2018
Diana focuses her campaign on an old flame. At the same time, Jenna helps Scott with his campaign and Morgan starts doing the morning announcements with Eli.
14	4	"Meet Cameron"	September 27, 2018
Diana tries to sway the class election. Eli invents a way for him and Morgan to learn about the latest gossip in school.
15	5	"Happy Birthday"	October 4, 2018
Cassie gets a surprise birthday gift when Sam fails to be a good boyfriend on her special day. Meanwhile, Diana faces the consequences of framing Scott.
16	6	"A Pretender to the Throne"	October 18, 2018
Jenna attends a banquet with Scott and Diana.
17	7	"Optional Compliment"	October 25, 2018
Cassie finds flaws in her relationship with Sam and makes her choice. Diana tries to befriend Morgan again, but it comes at the cost of Morgan's newfound friendship with Eli.
18	8	"Coffeeshopwork"	November 1, 2018
Kate tries to pull away from Luca. Cassie must deal with a new dynamic after Diana joins Magic Moves.
19	9	"New Partners"	November 8, 2018
Cassie finds out about Jenna's problem with shoplifting. Cassie and Julian work to define their relationship and Diana becomes Julian's new dance partner.
20	10	"Blackmail"	November 15, 2018
Kate is accused of stealing and is fired from her job. Jenna is blackmailed about the shoplifting, and Cassie takes the blame to save her.
21	11	"Find Your Voice"	November 22, 2018
The night of the Winter Formal, Diana shows up with an unexpected date, Morgan re-evaluates her feelings for Eli.

=== Season 3 (2019) ===
No. overall	No. in season	Title	Original release date
22	1	"Millwood Chronicles"	March 21, 2019
Cassie, Diana, and Kate find themselves at the end of their fantasies, as Jenna's childhood superhero fantasies return.
23	2	"Learning to Fly"	March 28, 2019
Cassie discovers an unexpected enemy at school. Gretchen asks Kate to befriend Luca. Diana deals with her problems with Julian.
24	3	"Experimental Film Club"	April 4, 2019
Cassie is convinced that Ms. Dawson is out to get her while Kate helps Morgan impress Eli's experimental film club with a film of her own.
25	4	"Watch Your Back"	April 11, 2019
Jenna falls under Ms. Dawson's threatening influence, just as she faces growing issues with Scott. Kate and Luca begin to bond with each other.
26	5	"X-Ray Eyes"	April 18, 2019
Sam and Luca work on a song together. Jenna receives advice from Ms. Dawson about her relationship with Scott.
27	6	"Thin Ice"	April 25, 2019
Cassie and Diana try to save Jenna from Ms. Dawson's grasp. Sam confronts Luca about his relationship with Kate.
28	7	"Teacher Knows Best"	May 2, 2019
Despite Spencer's warnings, Jenna gets ever closer to Ms. Dawson. Meanwhile, Eli gives Morgan an ultimatum.
29	8	"Bad Spell"	May 9, 2019
Kate deals with her Aunt Bonnie's passing.
30	9	"We Could Be Heroes"	May 16, 2019
Cassie and Diana work as a team to uncover Miss Dawson's past.
31	10	"Hanging Up The Cape"	May 23, 2019
Sam confronts Luca about the stolen song. Morgan, Cassie, and the girls band together for releasing Jenna from Ms. Dawson's evil grasp.

=== Season 4 (2019) ===
Axel and Belle are introduced this season.

No. overall	No. in season	Title	Original release date
32	1	"Future Self"	August 31, 2019
Morgan always fantasized about her life as a grown-up, but, with another semester under everyone's belt, that fantasy is quickly proving to be much more challenging than anyone could have anticipated.
33	2	"Brownie Points"	September 7, 2019
Jenna obsesses over Axel, but he has other plans
34	3	"One Turkey Sandwich"	September 14, 2019
Kate continues to reel from the brownie fallout, and Sam decides to explore other opportunities for his future beyond high school.
35	4	"Breakout"	September 21, 2019
Jenna continues to vie for Axel's attention, but his roving eye has all the girls at Millwood questioning his intentions.
36	5	"Ditch Day"	September 28, 2019
Diana ditches school.
37	6	"Bonding"	October 5, 2019
Kate invites the girls over for her birthday party.
38	7	"Lights Out"	October 12, 2019
A power outage brings some issues to the light.
39	8	"Millwood Casanova"	October 19, 2019
Sam gets the opportunity of a lifetime.
40	9	"Sam’s Jam"	October 26, 2019
Diana, Cassie, and Jenna seek the truth about Axel's true intentions.
41	10	"Come With Me"	November 2, 2019
Diana, Kate, and Jenna get some interesting news on Axel.

=== Season 5 (2020) ===
No. overall	No. in season	Title	Original release date
42	1	"Written In The Stars"	July 16, 2020
Cassie and her friends are facing new jobs, new hobbies, and new romances while they prepare for whatever the future holds.
43	2	"Rocky Start"	July 23, 2020
Cassie gets an unwelcome coworker at the Parlor, while Sam and Diana butt heads in summer school.
44	3	"Rock Stars"	July 30, 2020
Jenna and Diana face up to problems in their past.
45	4	"Cold War"	August 6, 2020
Tensions run high between Junior's Juice and the Parlor, with Cassie stuck in the middle.
46	5	"Life Gives You Lemons"	August 13, 2020
Cassie sees a new side of Axel, while Jenna entertains an old possibility.
47	6	"Rock and Roll"	August 20, 2020
Kate hatches a plan to save Junior's Juice, while Sam makes a difficult choice.
48	7	"Junior’s Juice"	August 27, 2020
The girls work together to make the grand opening of Junior's Juice a success.
49	8	"Shoot For The Moon"	September 3, 2020
As the summer winds down, everyone looks towards the future.

== Production ==
On March 12, 2018, Brat announced the series. Production for season 1 took place in Los Angeles that month. The show premiered on April 5, 2018. A second season of the series premiered on September 6, 2018. The third season of the series premiered on March 21, 2019.

In 2018, Brat released a special YouTube movie titled Brat Holiday Spectacular co-starring Ziegler as Cassie, Skinner as Diana, and other characters from Total Eclipse, that has been viewed more than 7.8 million times as of December 30, 2023.

== Reception ==
Forbes reported that Total Eclipse and Brat's most popular show, Chicken Girls, helped the network accumulate a "loyal audience" of 15 million viewers that "the company is beginning to monetize by moving into advertising in 2019".

Last updated on December 30, 2023
Season	Number of views (first episode)	Number of views (last episode)
1	7,839,803	6,192,768
2	4,140,765	2,596,344
3	3,347,850	2,339,562
4	2,709,163	1,913,904
5	1,981,994	961,069
