= Chloe East =

American actress (born 2001)

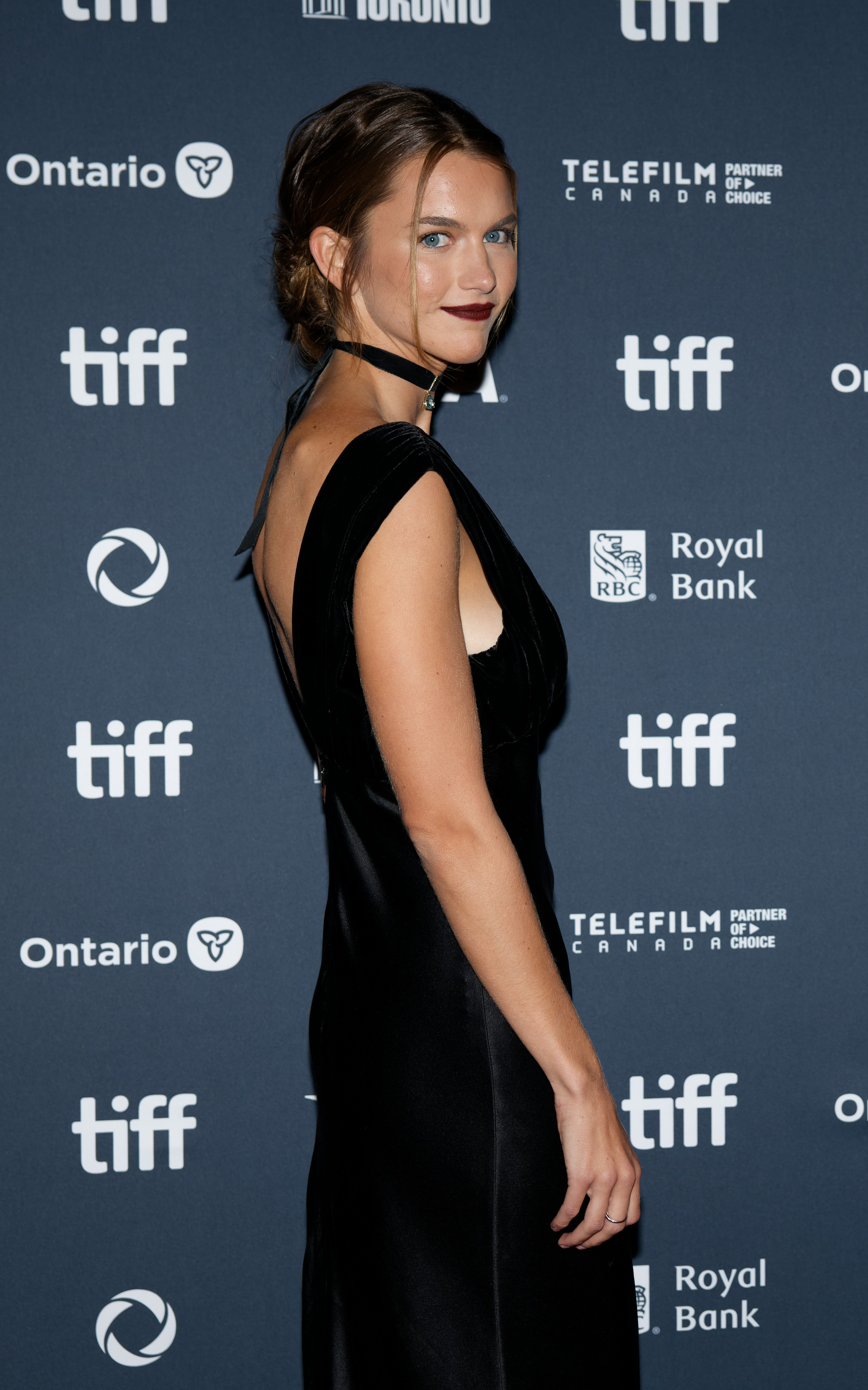
- East at the 2024 Toronto International Film Festival
- Born: February 16, 2001 (age 25); San Clemente, California, U.S.
- Occupation: Actress
- Years active: 2013–present
- Spouse: Ethan Precourt (m. 2021)

Chloe East (born February 16, 2001) is an American actress. She started her career as a child actress, appearing in two 2013 episodes of True Blood. She starred in the first season of Ice (2016–2017) and in the comedy-drama series Generation (2021). She has also featured in Steven Spielberg's semi-autobiographical The Fabelmans (2022), in the horror film Heretic (2024), and in the Netflix comedy Roommates (2026).

== Early life ==
East was born in 2001 in San Clemente, California. She has two brothers. She began dancing at age two, and has won many awards as a dancer. East grew up as a member of the Church of Jesus Christ of Latter-day Saints (LDS Church), but she is not currently a practicing member.

== Career ==
East began modeling at age 9, and at 11 she started acting in the HBO television series True Blood. Other credits include Jessica Darling in the film adaptation of Jessica Darling's IT List, and the recurring role of Val on Disney Channel series Liv and Maddie. In 2016, East was cast as Willow Pierce in the first season of the Audience Network drama television series Ice.

In March 2017, East was cast as Reese, the niece to Kevin, in the ABC drama television series Kevin (Probably) Saves the World, which aired in the 2017–2018 television season. In mid-2018, she was cast in the dancing film Next Level, which was released in 2019. In 2020, she appeared as Jenna in the film The Wolf of Snow Hollow. In 2021, East was cast in the Steven Spielberg coming-of-age drama film The Fabelmans, which was released in 2022. Her character, Monica Sherwood, who becomes the girlfriend of the protagonist Sammy Fabelman (Gabriel LaBelle) during the film's second half, was created for the film as a fictional high school girlfriend for Spielberg, whom the character of Sammy is based on. The same year, she was cast in the upcoming film Going Places. In September 2022, East wrapped filming on the family comedy film Popular Theory.

In 2024, she starred in the horror film Heretic alongside Hugh Grant and Sophie Thatcher. She and Thatcher play two LDS Church missionaries who enter the house of Grant's character, who makes them question their faith and terrorizes them. Both East and Thatcher were raised in the LDS Church, which the film's co-director Scott Beck cited as bringing credibility to their roles.

== Personal life ==
East married Ethan Precourt in October 2021. In an interview regarding Heretic in 2024, East stated she had been raised in the Mormon faith.

== Filmography ==
Key
†	Denotes films that have not yet been released

Film roles
Year	Title	Role	Notes
2013	Out of Reach	Angie	
2016	Jessica Darling's It List	Jessica Darling	
2019	Next Level	Lucy Rizzo	
2020	The Wolf of Snow Hollow	Jenna Marshall	
2022	The Fabelmans	Monica Sherwood	
2024	Popular Theory	Ari Page	
2024	Heretic	Sister Paxton	
2024	Tanning Zone	Lex	Short film; also director
2025	Atropia	Medic Grimes	
2025	Going Places	Cora	
2025	Interloper	Genevieve	Short film
2025	A Big Bold Beautiful Journey	Cheryl	
2026	At the Sea	Josie	
2026	Roommates	Celeste	
TBA	Whitney Springs †	TBA	Post-production
TBA	Rule of Three †	Amy	Post-production
TBA	An Innocent Girl †		Filming

Television roles
Year	Title	Role	Notes
2013	True Blood	11 Year Old Faerie Girl #3	Episodes: "You're No Good", "At Last"
2016	Sleep Tight	(unknown)	Episode: "Scout"
2016–2017	Ice	Willow Green	Main role (season 1), 10 episodes
2016–2017	Liv and Maddie	Val Wishart	Recurring role (season 4), 8 episodes
2017–2018	Kevin (Probably) Saves the World	Reese Cabrera	Main role, 16 episodes
2021	Generation	Naomi	16 episodes
2024	No Good Deed	Emily Morgan	Episodes: "Best and Final", "Sold"
