= Crown Lake =

American streaming series

- Genre: Anthology; Web series
- Created by: Sara Shepard
- Starring: Francesca Capaldi; Emily Skinner; Kyla-Drew; Ollie Walters; Lucas Stadvec; Izzi Rojas; Lexi Jayde; Andy Han; Symonne Harrison; Ellie Zeiler; Nick Bencivengo; Mya Nicole; Erika Titua; Josie Alesia
- Narrated by: Lilia Buckingham
- Opening theme: "Play Nice" by Jules LeBlanc
- Country of origin: United States
- Original language: English
- No. of seasons: 3
- No. of episodes: 24

Production
- Producers: Sara Shepard; Lilia Buckingham
- Camera setup: Single-camera
- Running time: 10-21 minutes
- Production company: Brat

Original release
- Network: YouTube
- Release: June 20, 2019 – May 31, 2022

Crown Lake is an American anthology web series produced and distributed by Brat TV. The series is written by Sara Shepard and produced by Shepard alongside Lilia Buckingham. It first premiered on June 20, 2019, and was renewed for a second season later that year. The first two seasons were set in 1994 and 1995 respectively. In February 2022, the series was renewed for a third season with a new cast and set in the present day.

== Premise ==
Set in 1994, the series follows Eleanor "Nellie" Chambers as she navigates being a new student at an elite boarding school with a guide left behind by a former student.

== Cast ==
=== Main ===
- Francesca Capaldi as Eleanor "Nellie" Chambers (season 1–2), a girl from a poor background desperate to fit in. She is attending Crown Lake Academy because the Roach Gang pay her tuition.
- Emily Skinner as Chloe Hauser (season 1–2), a rebellious outsider with limited social skills and Nellie’s best friend at Crown Lake. She is an amateur Slam Poet.
- Kyla-Drew as Tiffany St. Martin (season 1–2), a girl from a very rich background who is the most popular girl in Crown Lake and Nellie’s roommate.
- Lilia Buckingham as “Heather Masterson” (narrator), an unknown person who uses “Heather” as an identity to either help, bully, manipulate or attack people.
- Ollie Walters as Ryan Baker (season 1–2), Tiffany’s boyfriend who is from a poor background similar to Nellie’s who is attending Crown Lake under a scholarship. He is on the Crew, Lacrosse and Wrestling teams.
- Lucas Stadvec as Josh Lewis (sseason 1–2), a popular boy on the Wrestling and Scavenging teams whom Nellie takes an interest in. He is the son of the Head of Math, Dr. Lewis.
- Lexi Jayde as Lucy Quinn (season 2), a nerdy girl who enjoys computing and joins Crown Lake a semester after Nellie.
- Izzi Rojas as Lola Porecca (season 2), a rebellious goth who wishes to be a wrestler. She has a crush on Chloe.
- Andy Han as Nick Lazaro (season 2–3), the son of the Business Partner of Tiffany’s father and Nellie’s brief boyfriend. He is a drug dealer.
- Ellie Zeiler as Ari Lee (season 3), a popular girl who is struggling with her sexuality, dating a boy named Oliver but having feelings for her ex-roommate Lisa. She is roommates with Molly and she and Molly become close friends.
- Symonne Harrison as Molly King (season 3), a tomboyish girl from California who starts attending Crown Lake at the beginning of a new semester. She becomes interested in the “Heather” system and the Great Crown Lake Fire (which occurred during Nellie’s Senior Year at Crown Lake) after finding an old diary left by Nellie under her dorms floorboards.
- Nick Bencivengo as Danny (season 3), the son of Hank, the Caretaker at Crown Lake and Molly’s love Interest. He isn’t rich like most of the Crown Lake students, so he struggles to fit in.
- Mya Nicole as Lisa (season 3), a closeted lesbian who is trying to hide her sexuality and feelings for her best friend and ex-roommate Ari due to her homophobic family. She is at Crown Lake because of a Scholarship.
- Erika Titus as Callie Lee (season 3), the adopted older sister of Ari and the adopted younger sister of Electra. Unlike her adopted sisters, Callie is ditzy and carefree, but very kind.
- Josie Alesia as Electra Lee (season 3), the adopted older sister of Callie and Ari. She is stern and serious and Head of Student Council. She is a stickler for rules and obsessed with her studies.
- Nikolai Soroko as Oliver (season 3), a popular boy dating Ari. He is very spoiled and arrogant, and dangerous to anyone who crosses him.
- Jasmin Tatyana as Morgan (season 3), Lisa’s new roommate and an unpopular computer geek who spends most of her time on her computer. She designs an app for the school to post gossip about, The White Rabbit.
- Paula Jai Parker as Headmistress Tiffany Baker (season 3), the Headmistress of Crown Lake Academy in 2022, who replaces Headmistress Hauser when she takes maternity leave
- Thaddeus Newman as Rhys (season 3), one of Oliver’s friends who is not very intelligent but has a good heart. He is however described as a “player” by Callie.
- Maleah Woode as Ashley (season 3)
- Benni Ruby as Felicity (season 3), the most popular girl in school who is mean to Ari as she sees her as a rival.

=== Recurring ===
- Paula Jai Parker as Headmistress Catherine Merriweather (season 1–2), the Headmistress of Crown Lake Academy who is a stern disciplinarian and is strict and snarky. She’s also the Aunt of Tiffany St. Martin..
- Glory Curda as Becca Frank (season 1–2), a gossipy girl who is friends with Tiffany and best friends with Erin. She has a hopeless crush on Tiffany’s brother, Evan.
- Mia Dinoto as Erin Roy (season 1–2), a vain and ditzy girl who is friends with Tiffany and best friends with Becca. Like Becca, she has a hopeless crush on Tiffany’s brother, Evan.
- Nikki Crawford as Valerie St. Martin, the wealthy mother of Tiffany. She is very critical of her children and has high standards.
- Bleau Faz as Bethany (season 1), a student at Crown Lake in 1994.
- Vanessa Angel as Dr. Lewis (season 1), the Head of Math in 1994 and the mother of Josh.
- Paul Thomas Arnold as Junior Chambers (season 1), the father of Nellie and the Owner of a coffee shop. His wife Dana was violently murdered by the Roach Gang a year before Nellie transferred to Crown Lake.
- Jonah Hwang as Pete (season 1), a student at Crown Lake and Josh’s best friend. He is somewhat inappropriate and misogynistic towards girls.
- David Snyder as Chad (season 2), the Captain of the Wrestling Team. He is very arrogant and sexist.
- Noelle Perris as Ms. Rose (season 2–3), the school Guidance Councillor in 1995. She is cruel and sadistic, and despises Nellie. She attended Crown Lake at the same time as Nellie’s mother, Dana Roth, did.
- Jennifer Lee Laks as Dana Roth (season 1–2), the mother of Nellie who is violently murdered by the Roach Gang. Dana was a student at Crown Lake Academy with Ms Rose. Though they appear to have been best friends at one point, they despise each other in adult life because Dana bullied Ms Rose.
- Michelle Bernard as Randi Roach (season 1), where we see Randi coming up in the ranks under the Roach Mafia, run by her father, Jimmy Roach.

== Episodes ==
=== Series overview ===
Season	Episodes	Originally released	
Season	Episodes	First released	Last released
1	8	June 20, 2019	August 8, 2019
2	8	December 5, 2019	January 30, 2020
3	8	April 12, 2022	May 31, 2022

=== Season 1 (2019) ===
No. overall	No. in season	Title	Original release date
1	1	"Don't Tell"	June 20, 2019
In 1994, Nellie Chambers has a rough first day at Crown Lake Academy, but finds solace in the pages of a diary left behind by a former student, Heather Masterson.
2	2	"Tattle Wall"	June 27, 2019
At Crown Lake, dirt gives you power. But, is having power at the Academy worth losing a potential new friend over? Nellie's about to find out.
3	3	"The Escape"	July 4, 2019
Nellie and her popular roommate Tiffany set aside their differences (if only briefly) to escape detention.
4	4	"Girl's Rule"	July 11, 2019
Nellie and popular boy Josh hit it off until she learns about a long-standing and controversial rule about girls held during the Crown Lake Boys' Scavenger Hunt.
5	5	"Birdsong"	July 18, 2019
Unable to cope with the drama of Crown Lake, Nellie returns to her hometown, Attaway, but quickly discovers that things aren't much better at home.
6	6	"Revenge"	July 25, 2019
After the Scavenger Hunt debacle, Nellie returns to Crown Lake with vengeance.
7	7	"Who is Heather?"	August 1, 2019
Nellie uncovers a sad truth behind Tiffany's tough exterior. Meanwhile, Ryan investigates some of the strange goings-on at Crown Lake . . . with Nellie at the center.
8	8	"We All Wear Masks"	August 8, 2019
Nellie attends the masquerade ball, but uncovers much more than just the faces behind the masks.

=== Season 2 (2019–20) ===
No. overall	No. in season	Title	Original release date
9	1	"The Haunting"	December 5, 2019
A new semester at Crown Lake means it's time for "Heather" to find a new target . . . but, is Nellie up for the challenge? New student Lucy Quinn is nervous enough as it is, but will “Heather” be enough to help her out? Josh isn't sure about new student Nick.
10	2	"Programming 101"	December 12, 2019
Nellie struggles with the “Heather” system, especially after she and Lucy become friends. The schools new Guidance Councillor, Ms Rose (a former Crown Lake student), stirs up trouble for Nellie. Chloe sticks up for a rebellious girl, Lola, when her “secret” is exposed on the Tattle Wall by Lucy.
11	3	"Takedown"	December 19, 2019
Nellie and Lucy devise a scheme to knock Tiffany off her throne of popularity. Meanwhile, Lola tries to join the Wrestling Team and Josh becomes concerned about Nick’s “cures” which he is dealing to his new friends.
12	4	"Who We Become"	December 26, 2019
Tensions are at an all-time high as Lola challenges Chad, the Captain of the Wrestling Team. Josh confronts Nick about his "services", and Nellie stands up for Chloe against Tiffany’s bullying.
13	5	"New Queen"	January 9, 2020
With Tiffany's secret about her older brother exposed, Nellie rises up as the new Queen Bee. Meanwhile, Chloe faces her inner demons as she navigates her feelings about Lola.
14	6	"The Crypt"	January 16, 2020
Nellie spends the day in the "crypt” after Ms Rose gives her a cruel and unusual detention. Meanwhile, Chloe goes on an impromptu date and the entire school faces backlash when Nick's "study pills" are uncovered.
15	7	"Midterms"	January 23, 2020
As Nellie seeks revenge on Ms Rose, Chloe confronts her confusion, and Tiffany's recent financial problems are exposed. Nellie and Lucy sneak into Ms Rose’s office, learning Ms Rose was a student at Crown Lake at the same time as Nellie’s mother, Dana Roth, was. Nellie realises it was Ms Rose who got her mother expelled. They also find rude and cruel comments about all the students written by Ms Rose, which they expose. All the students are hurt and offended by Ms Rose, causing Headmistress Merriweather to fire her.
16	8	"The Key"	January 30, 2020
Nellie, Chloe and Tiffany uncover home truths about Nellie’s mother, revealing that the reason Ms Rose hates Nellie is because her mother bullied Ms Rose very badly. Meanwhile, Nick desperately tries to hide his drugs to avoid expulsion.

=== Season 3 (2022) ===
No. overall	No. in season	Title	Original release date
17	1	"Heather Is Back"	April 12, 2022
New student Molly has a rough first day at Crown Lake Academy in 2022. Headmistress Chloe Hauser takes maternity leave and is replaced by Headmistress Baker.
18	2	"Secrets Out"	April 19, 2022
Molly makes a startling discovery which opens the gates to the past. Molly’s roommate, Ari, has a difficult conversation with her best friend Lisa, and an even worse conversation with her boyfriend, Oliver.
19	3	"I Think She Did It"	April 26, 2022
A scandalous post is made about Ari on a new app for the school, The White Rabbit, designed by a girl named Morgan
20	4	"The Past Comes Knocking"	May 3, 2022
Molly and Ari are forced to be in detention together. Morgan’s app, The White Rabbit, gets hacked.
21	5	"Rumor Has It"	May 10, 2022
Oliver continues bullying Ari, along with mean girl Felicity. Molly seeks answers about Nellie Chambers and the Great Crown Lake Fire in 1996 from Headmistress Baker.
22	6	"Take Back The Narrative"	May 17, 2022
Ari comes out as gay to the school via The White Rabbit. Ari’s sister Callie leads a protest against the dress code. Molly ends up getting suspended from school, however as her home is far away in California she is kept under house arrest in her dorm.
23	7	"Riddle Me This"	May 24, 2022
Despite her obsessions with Heather Masterson getting her suspended, Molly cannot help herself from trying to figure out Heather’s latest riddle. Molly’s stepfather, Nick Lazaro, visits her.
24	8	"The End Is The Beginning"	May 31, 2022
Ari and Lisa are locked in Heather’s den. A power cut started by Heather causes yet another fire to start.

== Production ==
In May 2019, it was announced Sara Shepard would produce the series for Brat, with Francesca Capaldi, Emily Skinner, Kyla-Drew, Ollie Walters, Glory Curda, and Lucas Stadvec in the cast. Lilia Buckingham would co-produce in her debut producing gig and narrate.

The first episode premiered on June 20, 2019. In November 2019, a teaser and trailer were released for season 2, which premiered on December 5, 2019.

Through Twitter, Brat hinted that plans for a third season were in development, but on hold due to the COVID-19 pandemic.

Brat confirmed on Twitter that season 3 was in development.

In February 2022, Brat confirmed on Twitter that it had started filming, saying it'd be "a little different" and shared a teaser.

== Reception ==
Last updated on June 8, 2022
Season	Number of views (first episode)	Number of views (last episode)
1	3.3+ million	1.3+ million
2	1.9+ million	1.2+ million
3	648+ thousands	177+ thousands
