= An Innocent Girl =

American drama film

- Directed by: Jaume Collet-Serra
- Written by: Michael Mohan; Marc Guggenheim; Carly Wray
- Produced by: Greg Berlanti; Sarah Schechter
- Starring: Chloe East; Kerry Washington; Colman Domingo; James Marsden; Kim Dickens; Paul Sparks; Rob Corddry
- Production company: Berlanti Productions
- Distributed by: Netflix
- Country: United States
- Language: English

An Innocent Girl is an upcoming American psychological thriller film directed by Jaume Collet-Serra and starring Chloe East, Kerry Washington, James Marsden and Colman Domingo. It is set to be released on Netflix.

== Premise ==
A young and ambitious woman is seduced by a high-powered DC couple and finds herself drawn into a dangerous world of sex, power, and murder.

== Cast ==
- Chloe East
- Kerry Washington
- Colman Domingo
- James Marsden
- Kim Dickens
- Paul Sparks
- Rob Corddry

== Production ==
In April 2025, it was announced that Jaume Collet-Serra would direct An Innocent Girl, from a script by Michael Mohan, Marc Guggenheim and Carly Wray; Netflix would distribute.

In February 2026, Kerry Washington, Chloe East, James Marsden and Colman Domingo joined the cast. In April 2026, Kim Dickens, Paul Sparks and Rob Corddry joined the cast with filming underway.

Filming occurred on April 23, 2026, at CM Food Mart in Bergen County, New Jersey. Scenes will be filmed in Middletown, New Jersey.
