= Jack Vale (comedian) =

American YouTube personality, comedian, actor, and producer

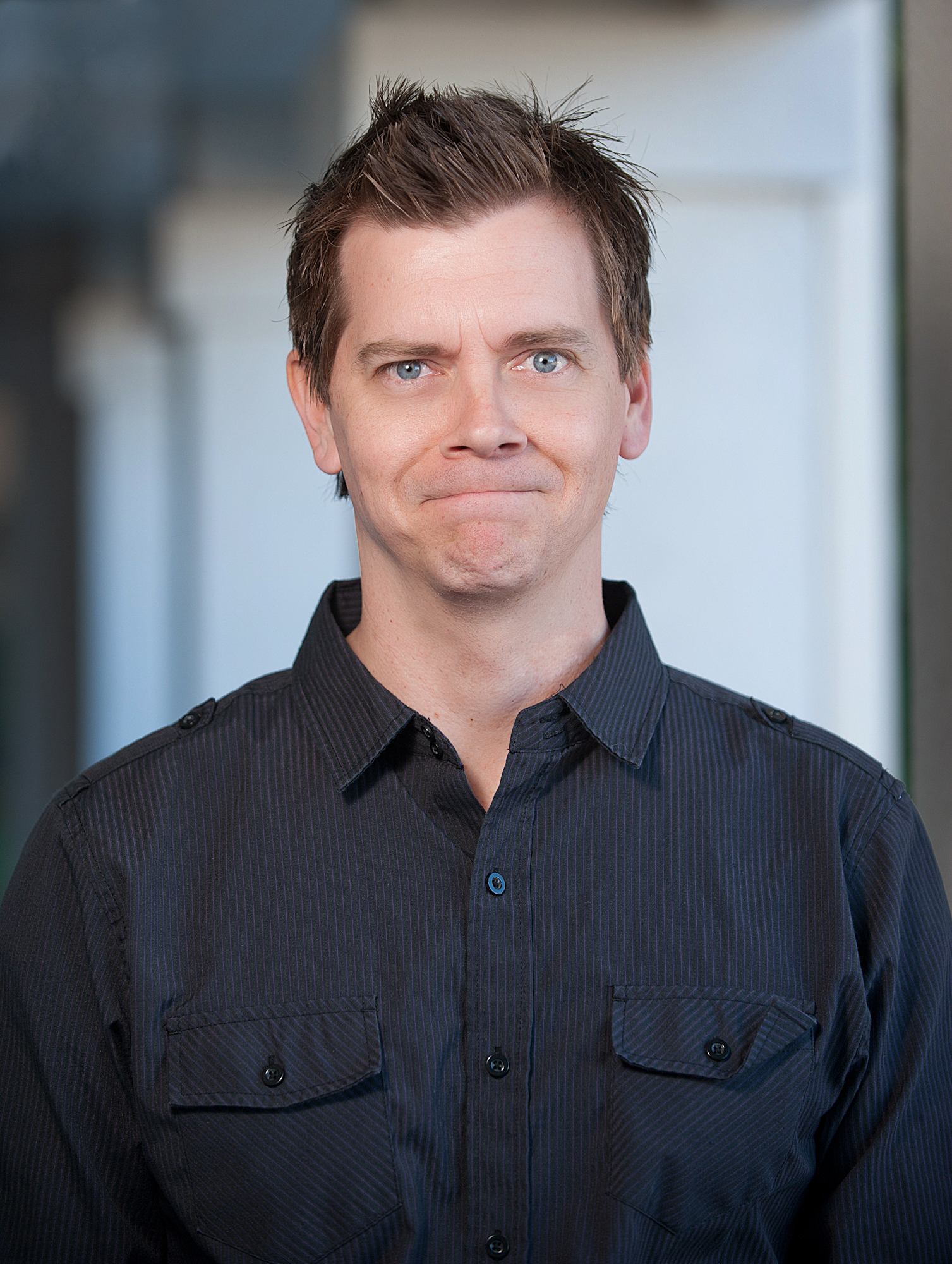
- Vale in 2012
- Born: September 2, 1973 (age 53); Lodi, California, U.S.
- Occupations: YouTube personality; comedian; actor; producer
- Years active: 1998–present
- Spouse: Sherry Vale (m. 1997)
- Children: 5

YouTube information
- Channel: Jack Vale Films
- Genres: Comedy; practical jokes
- Subscribers: 1.84 million
- Views: 805 million
- Last updated: April 23, 2026

Jack Vale (born September 2, 1973) is an American YouTube personality, comedian, actor, and producer who has a YouTube channel featuring hidden cameras and pranks. As of September 2025, his videos have over 748 million views and his channel has more than 1.8 million subscribers.

== YouTube ==
Many of Vale's pranks are what he calls "Pooter" pranks involving him walking around in public making flatulence sounds, using a handheld device and capturing the reactions of the people nearby on a hidden camcorder. On one occasion that resulted in a physical altercation between Vale and an elderly man (whose wife was the unsuspecting participant which Vale used the device by). The subsequent police intervention led to Vale being banned from that specific supermarket. Many of his pranks happen in Huntington Beach, California; Nevada, and near his home in the Columbia, Tennessee vicinity.

Other pranks include "Paranoid", sketches in which Vale, pretending to be talking on his mobile phone, walks past customers in a shop or on the street talking about them to his imaginary conversational partner (in order to see whether they will react with paranoia), and "Nonsense", in which Vale confuses members of the public by approaching them and speaking gibberish.

Jack Vale's most elaborate prank to date, which by most is considered to be more of an experiment, is called "The Social Media Experiment". He searched hashtags in his local area and found people in the area. Next, he learned all about the people so he could convince them he was psychic. The video was picked up by several national publications and he made appearances on various talk shows explaining how he did the experiment.

== Jack Vale Offline ==
In 2015, Vale's reality TV show Jack Vale Offline premiered on January 13 on HLN, a network owned by CNN. The show gave a behind-the-scenes look at his prank videos and his family life. It ran for six episodes.

== Television and film ==
On September 18, 2014, Vale appeared on Jimmy Kimmel Live! in a segment he shot with Guillermo and Vale's family using the Social Media Experiment.

Vale has appeared on Lopez Tonight, performing pranks on various celebrities at the 53rd Grammy Awards, and performing pranks at a reality television show convention. He co-produced and starred in all 40 episodes of the first season of TV's Bloopers & Practical Jokes (hosted by Dean Cain) with Dick Clark Productions when the show was revived in 2012. In 2012, he was the producer for 40 episodes of Bloopers for Dick Clark Productions.

In July 2014, Vale made an appearance on The View where he talked about filming Social Media Experiments and the "Pooter". He has appeared on Fox & Friends, CNBC, The Doctors, and other TV shows. He starred as Director Bob in Next Level. a 2019 teen dance film.

== Personal life ==
Vale and his wife, Sherry, married on October 18, 1997. They have five children: Madysyn, Jaxon, Chris, Jake and Jazmyn.

== Filmography ==
Year	Title	Role	Notes
1998	Pleasantville	Thug	Uncredited
2014	Rubberhead	Groom 1	Television film
2014	Jimmy Kimmel Live!	Himself	1 episode
2014	The View	Himself	1 episode
2016	Brennan	Ryan Brinson	
2019	Next Level	Director Bob	

== Crew work ==
Year	Title	Position	Notes
2012	Bloopers	Producer	40 episodes
2015	Jack Vale Offline	Executive producer	6 episodes
2018	Life in Reverse	Executive producer	
2021	Long Road Home: The Cash Family's Untold Story	Executive producer	Documentary
