= Michelle Bernard (actress) =

American actress

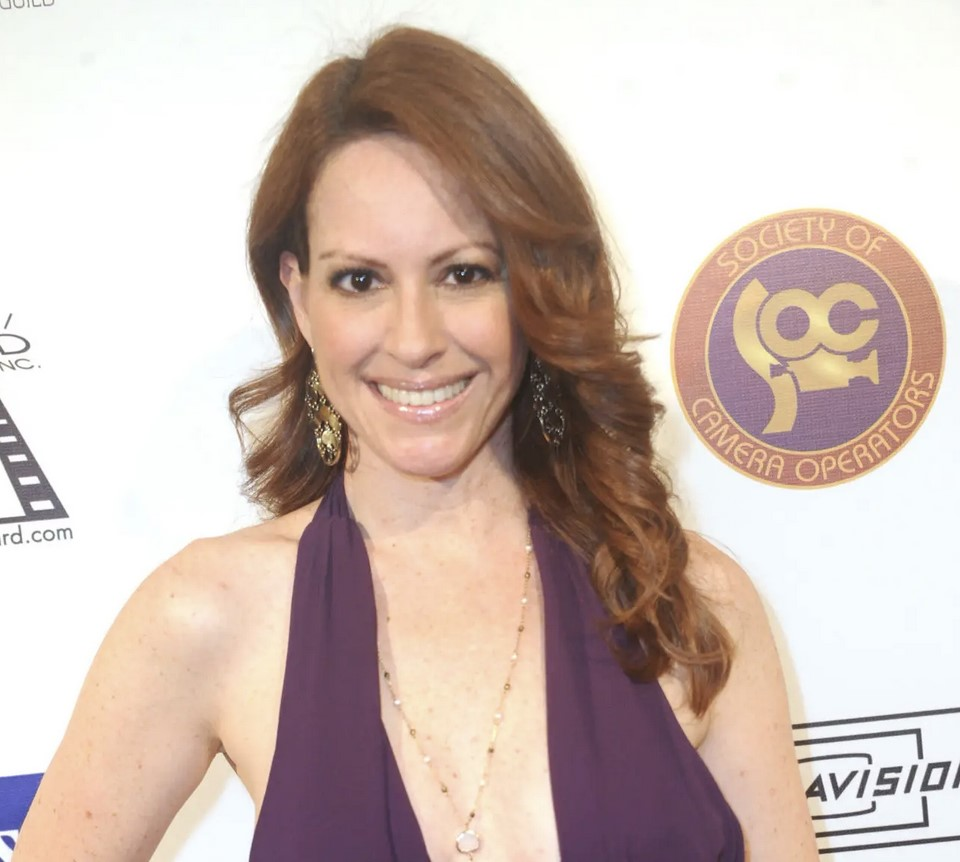
- Occupation: Actor-Model
- Years active: 1999 - present
- Website: michellebernard.com

Michelle Bernard is an American actor and writer. Bernard has been working in Hollywood since January 1999, from her first feature film role in Any Given Sunday.

She has a recurring role playing a police officer on the Prime-time hit TV show, 9-1-1. She also worked on seasons 1 and 2 of The Rookie. She has also had roles in the TV shows such as Dads, Rake, and Ironside. Bernard won an acting award in 2014 for her role-playing drug addict "Tori" in an American Film Institute film titled "Young Americans" which won numerous awards and accolades at the Milledgeville, GA Film Festival. Bernard also won a "Silver People's Telly Award" in 2019 for her recurring role as "Randi Roach" for Brat TV.

Bernard has been an member of the Television Academy of Arts and Sciences for over 13 years.

In addition to acting, Bernard is a writer, and has journals dating back to December 1998, and is currently putting together her first novel, based on her blog, "There's Always F**kin' Somethin'" and 47 hand-written journals.

== Early life ==
Bernard began paying her dues working as a background actor on shows such as Sex and the City, Law & Order and The Sopranos.

In July 2003, Bernard moved to Hollywood, CA. Bernard studied at Beverly Hills Playhouse under the direction of Milton Katselas, Allen Barton, and Art Cohan. Bernard also worked with Bobbie Chance at Expressions Unlimited and continued to perfect her craft at Improv at the famed Groundlings in Hollywood. Bernard created her own web series on YouTube called 'BackstageGirlsTV.' She starred in, produced, directed, and edited this project with Stephanie Ann Saunders.

Bernard was part the first run of the play entitled "Married People: A Comedy" which opened February 23, 2017, at The Zephyr Theater in Hollywood.

Bernard has also turned 45 hand-written journals into her "There's Always F**king Somethin" blog. Her first novel is currently being written.

Bernard recurred on two prime-time TV shows, and on four streaming services web-series. In March 2018, Bernard worked on her first episode of 9-1-1. She has played the role of 'Officer Carol Branford' for 10 seasons as of October 2026.

In February 2019, Bernard appeared on The Rookie, playing the role of 'Officer DeSantos' for 2 seasons.

In October 2018, Bernard worked on the web-series, "Dirt." Bernard played "Randi Roach," a mob boss. Her character crossed over to "On the Ropes," centering around real-life lightweight champion Ryan Garcia, which aired on the Brat TV Channel in February 2019.

== Filmography ==
=== Film ===
| Year | Title | Role | Notes |
|---|---|---|---|
| 1999 | Any Given Sunday | Tina the Waitress/Players Wife | |
| 2000 | Da Hip Hop Witch | Big Z's Lady | |
| 2011 | The Snow Queen | Flight Attendant | |
| 2012 | Shit Actor's Say | Michelle/Herself | Short |
| 2013 | Santorini Blue | Stephanie | |
| 2014 | Young Americans | Tori Harper | |
| 2014 | Easy Silence | Samantha Sway | |
| 2015 | Body High | Punk Bus Driver | |
| 2018 | Bianca | Bianca's Mother | Short |
| 2019 | Surge of Power: Revenge of the Sequel | Miranda/Black Out | |
| 2020 | Disrupted | Cinnamon | |
| 2020 | Tar | Detective Finnegan | |
| 2022 | Breaking | Barricade Cop | |
| 2026 | Money's Tight | Mrs. Williams | Short |

=== Television ===
| Year | Title | Role | Notes |
|---|---|---|---|
| 2002 | Sex and the City | Cigarette Girl | Season 5, Episode 1 |
| 2012 | Bent | Big Red | Pilot |
| 2012 | Backstage Girls | Michelle/Herself | Main Role - (12 episodes) |
| 2013 | America's Court with Judge Ross | Chloe Cruz | Season 3, Episode 195 |
| 2013 | Ironside | NY1 Reporter | Season 1, Episode 2 |
| 2014 | Dads | AA Member #1 | Season 1, Episode 17 |
| 2014 | Killer Kids | Angela Rourke | Season 3, Episode 9 |
| 2014 | Rake (American TV series) | Betsey | Season 1, Episode 13 |
| 2016 | Grease: Live! | Hazel the Waitress | |
| 2016 | Codes and Conspiracies | FBI Agent | Season 3, Episode 6 |
| 2018 | The Rookie | Officer DeSantos | Recurring Role - Seasons 1 - 2 (4 episodes) |
| 2018–present | 9-1-1 | Officer Carol Branford | Recurring Role - Seasons 1 - 6, Season 9 - Present (14 Episodes) |
| 2019 | Dirt | Randi Roach | Main Role- Season 2- (7 episodes) |
| 2019 | On the Ropes | Randi Roach | Season 1, Episode 8 |
| 2019 | Crown Lake | Randi Roach | Season 1, Episode 5 |
| 2019 | Why Women Kill | Red Haired Woman 1963 | Season 1, Episode 2 |
| 2020 | Total Eclipse | Randi Roach | Recurring Role - Season 5 (3 episodes) |
| 2024 | The Neighbor Who Saw Too Much | Detective | Lifetime Movie |
| 2024 | The Life I Can't Remember | Jennifer Young | Lifetime Movie |
| 2025 | From Dumped Wife to Christmas Billionaire | Mom | Vertical Series- (1 episode) |
| 2025 | VIC | Kat | Vertical Series- (3 episodes) |
| 2026 | The Double Life of a Billionaire's Sweet Ex-Wife | The Doctor | Recurring Role - (10 episodes) |
| 2026 | Your Ex-Wife is a Billionaire Heiress | The Doctor | Recurring Role - (10 episodes) |

=== Music videos ===
| Year | Title | Role | Notes |
|---|---|---|---|
| 2013 | The Neighbourhood | Mom | I Love You (The Neighbourhood album) "Everybody's Watching Me" |
| 2014 | The Midnight Beast | Mom | Shtick Heads "Bass Face" |
| 2014 | Above & Beyond | Louise | We Are All We Need "We're All We Need" |
| 2024 | Sleepy Hallow | Mom | Non-album single "Winners in Paris" |
