= One Too Many Mornings (film) =

- Directed by: Michael Mohan
- Written by: Anthony Deptula; Stephen D.B. Hale; Michael Mohan
- Starring: Anthony Deptula; Stephen Hale; Tina Kapousis
- Music by: Capybara
- Release date: January 22, 2010 (Sundance)
- Running time: 78 minutes
- Language: English

One Too Many Mornings is a 2010 American independent comedy film directed by Michael Mohan, who co-wrote the film with Anthony Deptula and Stephen D.B. Hale. Deptula and Hale also star in the film alongside Tina Kapousis, Red State Update's Jonathan Shockley, and the Actors' Gang's V.J. Foster. Its title references Bob Dylan's song "One Too Many Mornings", and an original theme song with the same title was written and performed for the movie by Brad Breeck of The Mae Shi. Unlike many mumblecore films, the film plays out entirely in black and white, and was shot over the span of 2 years.

Director Michael Mohan currently directs music videos for Dangerbird Records. Members of Dangerbird band Division Day make cameos as extras in the film.

One Too Many Mornings was announced as a noncompetition entry at the 2010 Sundance Film Festival on December 3, 2009.

== Plot ==
Peter has just run away from his girlfriend of 5 years, seeking solace in his estranged friend from high school, Fischer.

Fischer lives in a church, for free, in exchange for turning off the lights and locking the doors. It's a good fit for him – he doesn't really have any aspirations beyond that. As Fischer tries to help Peter recover, Peter quickly learns that Fischer has much more serious problems of his own.
