= Bill Reiter =

Television personality

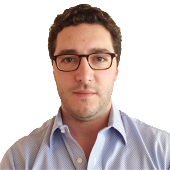
Bill Reiter

Bill Reiter is a writer and sports personality for CBS Sports. He is best known for hosting Reiter Than You, CBS Sports' first live primetime digital television show. His early work reporting on LeBron James during Lebron's first season with the Miami Heat also distinguished Fox Sports and its early NBA coverage. Reiter currently hosts "Reiter Than You" from 10 a.m.-noon on Infinity Sports Network (formerly known as CBS Sports Radio) and is the NBA Insider and NBA columnist for CBS Sports.

== Career ==
Reiter graduated from the Missouri School of Journalism in 2000. His early journalism career included writing for the Chicago Tribune and covering Bill Clinton and the Mississippi Delta in Arkansas. He then worked at The Des Moines Register writing long-form features. While at The Des Moines Register, Reiter spent months fully immersed in a story about homeless teenagers which prompted him to start writing about sports. Starting in 2006, Reiter wrote sports features full-time for the Kansas City Star. From there he worked with the Miami Heat as a columnist-beat writer for FoxSports.com before becoming a national columnist. As national columnist he covered the Jerry Sandusky scandal, Linsanity, the UFC, college football, and the NFL playoffs.

Reiter joined CBS Sports in 2017 as a national columnist. In his current role he has covered the NBA, the NFL, the MLB, UFC, the Olympics, Super Bowls, March Madness and more.

== Awards and Quotes ==
He has received seven honors from the Associated Press Sports Editors for his work with the Kansas City Star including Game Story of the Year. Livingston Awards named Reiter a finalist for an investigative piece on Bob Huggins' recruiting practices. Reiter was three times a notable selection in Best American Sportwriting and won the Missouri Lifestyle Journalism Awards for "Our Homeless Children," a six-part narrative on Iowa's homeless youth. He has been honored more than 40 times with various state and regional awards.

Director of Programming at CBS Sports Radio, Eric Spitz said, "The talented Bill Reiter will bring a fresh new voice and an energizing perspective to CBS Sports Radio's already stellar lineup featuring the best sports talk shows and personalities around. His candid commentary and keen analysis will be a welcome addition to the network."
