= Marcus Buckingham =

English author, motivational speaker and business consultant

- Born: Marcus Wilfrid Buckingham; 11 January 1966 (age 60); High Wycombe, Buckinghamshire, England
- Education: Pembroke College, Cambridge (BA)
- Occupations: Author, motivational speaker, businessman
- Spouse: Jane Buckingham (m. 1996; div. 2017)
- Children: 2, including Lilia Buckingham

Marcus Wilfrid Buckingham (born 11 January 1966) is an English author, motivational speaker and business consultant based in California.

== Early life and education ==
Buckingham was born in High Wycombe, Buckinghamshire and grew up in the village of Radlett, Hertfordshire. His father was the Personnel Director at Allied Breweries. Buckingham had a stammer which he initially struggled with, and said he was unable to speak until the age of 13. He learned to manage it when asked to formally address other boys at his prep school, and pretended he was speaking to just one person, rather than 300. It proved a success: "At my prep school, everyone knew I had a stammer. At my boarding school, nobody knew."

Buckingham was educated at Edge Grove School, a boys' preparatory independent school in the village of Aldenham in Hertfordshire in Southern England, and then Aldenham School, a boarding independent school for boys (near Aldenham), which he left in 1984, followed by Pembroke College, Cambridge, from which he graduated with a degree in Social and Political Sciences, in 1987.

== Career ==
While studying at Cambridge, Buckingham was recruited by educational psychology professor Donald O. Clifton, the founder of Selection Research, Incorporated (SRI). Clifton had co-founded SRI to develop interviews that would allow businesses to identify talents in individuals, to match people to the right roles.

SRI acquired The Gallup Organization in 1988, and took on the Gallup name. As part of Gallup, Buckingham became a member of a team working on a survey that measured a broad range of factors that contribute to employee engagement. Based on those surveys and on interviews with thousands of managers, Buckingham published (with coauthor Curt Coffman) First, Break All the Rules (Simon and Schuster, 1999). According to its subtitle, the book describes "what the world's greatest managers do differently" The book became a New York Times best-seller and has over a million copies in print. It was also chosen by Jack Covert and Todd Sattersten as one of "The 100 Best Business Books of All Time" in their book of the same name.

=== The Marcus Buckingham Company (TMBC) ===
In 2006, Buckingham started The Marcus Buckingham Company (TMBC) to create management training programs and tools. The company helped him to launch a coordinated series of products in conjunction with the publication of Go Put Your Strengths to Work. Most notable was Trombone Player Wanted, involving a young boy who wants to abandon playing the trombone in favour of the drums (apparently based on Buckingham's own experience in music classes as a boy). Together, the book and the film series became the basis of a TMBC workshop called "Simply Strengths".

TMBC was acquired by ADP, LLC in January 2017.

=== Film and television appearances ===
In addition to the self-published short film series Trombone Player Wanted, Buckingham has made numerous television appearances as himself, on US television networks and cable channels including The View on ABC, I Want to Work for Diddy on VH1, The Oprah Winfrey Show on syndication, Good Morning America on ABC and The Jane Pauley Show.

== Personal life ==
Buckingham and American author Jane Rinzler married in 1996 and divorced in 2017. They have a son, Jack, and a daughter, Lilia. He lives in California.

== Publications ==
- First, Break All the Rules (with Curt Coffman; Simon & Schuster, 1999)
- Now, Discover Your Strengths (with Donald O. Clifton; The Free Press, 2001)
- The One Thing You Need to Know (The Free Press, 2005)
- Go Put Your Strengths to Work (The Free Press, 2007)
- The Truth About You (Thomas Nelson, 2008)
- Find Your Strongest Life (Thomas Nelson, 2009)
- StandOut: The Groundbreaking New Strengths Assessment from the Leader of the Strengths Revolution (Thomas Nelson, 2011)
- StandOut 2.0: Assess Your Strengths. Find Your Edge. Win at Work. (Harvard Business Review Press, 2015)
- Nine Lies About Work: A Freethinking Leader's Guide to the Real World (Harvard Business Review Press, 2019)
- Love+Work (Harvard Business Review Press, 2022) ISBN 978-1647821234

== See also ==
- The Gallup Organization
- Mihaly Csikszentmihalyi
- David Cooperrider
