= First, Break All the Rules =

1999 book by Marcus Buckingham

- Cover
- Author: Marcus Buckingham and Curt Coffman
- Language: English
- Subject: Management, employee satisfaction, motivating workers
- Genre: Nonfiction
- Published: May 1999 (Simon & Schuster)
- Publication place: United States
- Media type: Print, hardcover
- Pages: 271
- ISBN: 0-684-85286-1
- OCLC: 40762827
- Dewey Decimal: 658.4/09 21
- LC Class: HD38.2 .B83 1999

First, Break All the Rules, subtitled What the World's Greatest Managers Do Differently (1999) is a self-help book authored by Marcus Buckingham and Curt Coffman about improving employee satisfaction. The book appeared on the New York Times bestseller list for 93 weeks.Time magazine listed the book as one of "The 25 Most Influential Business Management Books".

== Content outline ==
Buckingham and Coffman discuss the fallacies of standard management thinking and how good managers create and sustain employee satisfaction. The book is a result of observations based on 80,000 interviews with managers as conducted by the Gallup Organization between 1975 and 2000. The book goes into detail on debunking old myths about management, and gives advice to employers on how to obtain and keep talented people in their organization.

Key ideas from the book include:

- treating every employee as an individual.
- not trying to fix weaknesses, but instead focusing on strengths and talent.
- finding ways to measure, count, and reward outcomes

== See also ==
- Motivation
