= Mackenzie Ziegler =

American singer and actress (born 2004)

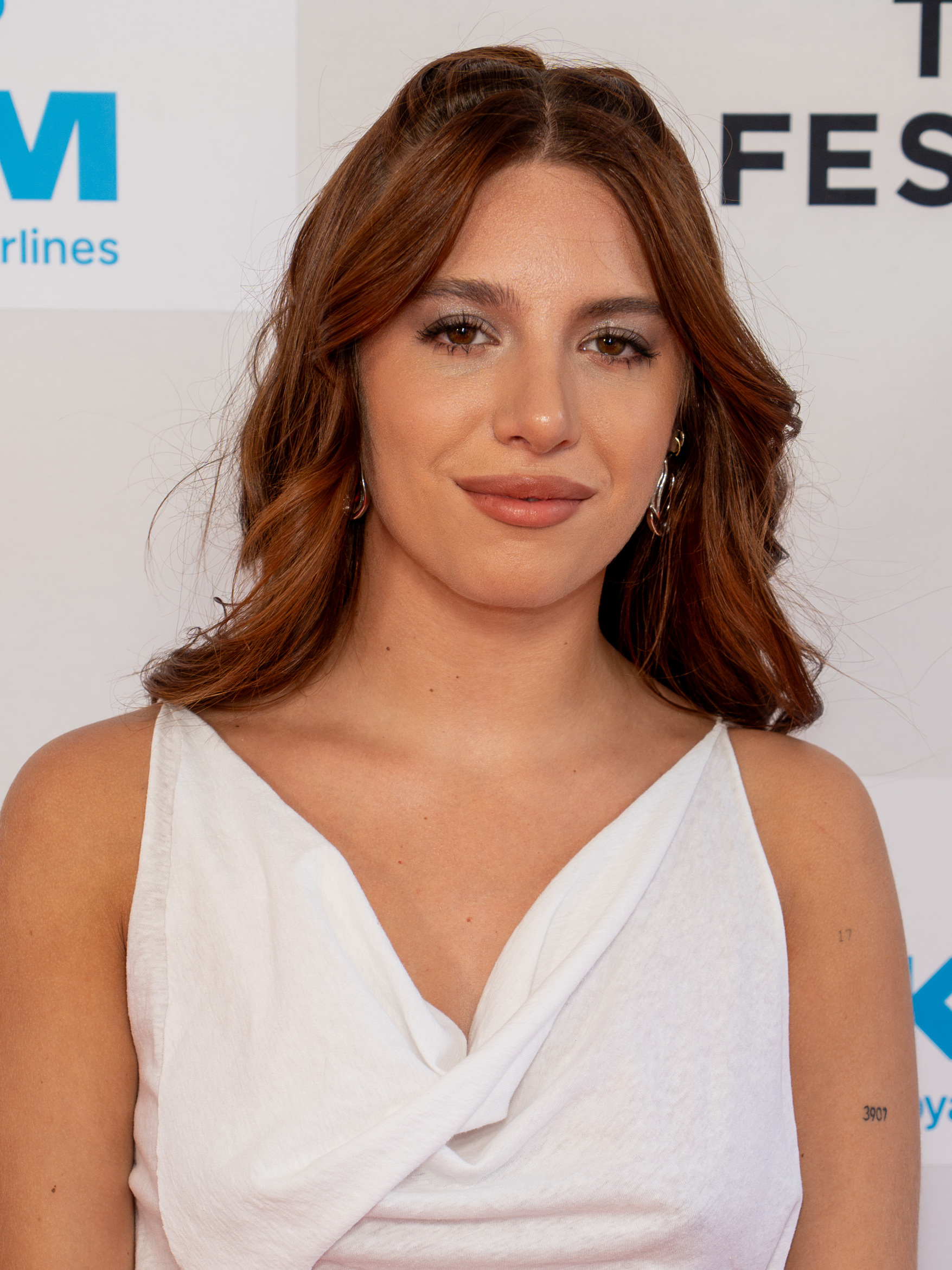
- Ziegler in 2025
- Born: Mackenzie Frances Ziegler; June 4, 2004 (age 22); Pittsburgh, Pennsylvania, US
- Occupations: Singer; actress
- Years active: 2011–present
- Relatives: Maddie Ziegler (sister)

TikTok information
- Page: Mackenzie Ziegler
- Followers: 23 million
- Last updated: September 17, 2025

Mackenzie Frances Ziegler (born June 4, 2004) is an American singer, actress, internet personality, and dancer. She appeared as a child for six years on the Lifetime reality dance series Dance Moms.

Ziegler's music career began with her 2014 studio album, Mack Z. In 2018 she released her second studio album, Phases. She has joined singer Johnny Orlando in joint concert tours in North America and Europe and has released several other singles with Orlando and several solo releases. In 2017 and 2018, Ziegler traveled in Australia and New Zealand on dance workshop tours with her sister, Maddie. She has also modeled for Polo Ralph Lauren. Her third album, Biting My Tongue, was released in 2024. Later in 2024, she joined Mark Ambor on his Rockwood tour.

In addition to Dance Moms, Ziegler has appeared on other television series, including the sitcom Nicky, Ricky, Dicky & Dawn (2015 and 2017). From 2018 to 2020, she starred in the Brat TV high school drama series Total Eclipse. In 2018 she also competed on Dancing with the Stars: Juniors and starred as Dorothy in a holiday stage pantomime adaptation, The Wonderful Winter of Oz, in Pasadena, California.

As of February 2022, Ziegler had accumulated more than 14 million Instagram followers, 23 million TikTok followers, 3 million YouTube subscribers, and one million Twitter followers.

== Early life ==
Ziegler was born in Pittsburgh, Pennsylvania, to Melissa Ziegler-Gisoni and Kurt Ziegler and grew up in Murrysville, Pennsylvania. She is of Polish, Italian and German descent. Her parents divorced when she was 6 years old after a 2009 bankruptcy. Her mother remarried Greg Gisoni in 2013. Ziegler has an older sister, Maddie, who is also a dancer and actress, as well as two older paternal half-brothers, Ryan and Tyler, and two older step-siblings, Matthew and Michelle. She began dancing at the Abby Lee Dance Company in Pittsburgh at the age of two. With that company, she won titles in dance competitions. Ziegler was homeschooled.

From August 2020 to late 2023, Ziegler dated Tacoda Dubbs.

== Career ==
=== 2011–2016: Dance Moms and Mack Z ===
Ziegler first appeared on television in 2011 on Lifetime's reality dance show Dance Moms, alongside her mother and sister. In 2016, the Zieglers left the show after six seasons to pursue other projects. Ziegler also appeared on Dance Moms' sister shows Abby's Ultimate Dance Competition and Abby's Studio Rescue.

In 2014, Ziegler released her debut album titled Mack Z, which she also used as a stage name for singing appearances. The album peaked at #1 on the iTunes pop charts, as well as #7 on iTunes' albums sales chart across all genres. The music video for the album's lead single, "Girl Party", also reached #1 on the iTunes pop chart. The video of the single has been viewed more than 85 million times. Later that year, her videos for "Shine" and "Christmas All Year Long" premiered. She continued to release singles and videos as Mack Z in 2015 and 2016. In 2014, Ziegler and her sister released a limited edition fashion line, The Maddie & Mackenzie Collection, through Mod Angel.

In 2015, Ziegler made her acting debut on Nickelodeon's sitcom Nicky, Ricky, Dicky & Dawn and appeared in a WowWee commercial alongside her sister. She returned to Nicky, Ricky, Dicky & Dawn in January 2017 in the episode "Keeping Up with the Quadashians". Also in 2015, she walked the Polo Ralph Lauren Runway in New York City and appeared in an ad campaign video for Glamour Magazine.

=== 2016–2017: Music and touring ===
In November 2016, Ziegler released her first single under her full name, a duet with singer Johnny Orlando, titled "Day & Night". The duet's music video was released on December 21, 2016, and has been viewed more than 25 million times. In 2017–2018, Ziegler and Orlando presented their Day & Night Tour throughout North America and the UK. Her 2017 video "Breathe" has been viewed more than 54 million times, and the video of her 2018 duet with Orlando, "What If", has been viewed more than 75 million times.

In 2016, she and her sister were the faces of Clean & Clear's fall back-to-school campaign. Ziegler was the face of Polo Ralph Lauren's children's spring 2016 collection and was named a brand ambassador for girls' fashion line Emily West in 2017. In 2016, Ziegler collaborated with TurnBoard to release the Kenzie Ziegler TurnBoard, a turning practice tool for dancers. In 2017 and 2018, Ziegler collaborated on dance-inspired activewear clothing lines with tween retailer Justice. Justice also collaborated with her on a video of her song, "Teamwork", a back-to-school social media campaign with an anti-bullying theme, to promote the line. Later that year, Ziegler released a tee-shirt line called Tee4Too, and, with FanJoy in 2019, she released a line of sweatshirts and tee-shirts.

Ziegler and her sister conducted a dance workshop tour of Australia in January 2017. Ziegler is featured in a 2017 dance advertisement for General Electric. They conducted another dance workshop tour of Australia and New Zealand in mid-2018.

=== 2018–2023: Total Eclipse and Dancing with the Stars Juniors ===
From 2018 to 2020, Ziegler starred as Cassie, a teenage girl coping with unpopularity, in the high school drama series Total Eclipse on the Brat TV digital network. She was an executive producer for the show. She also co-starred as the same character in the film Brat Holiday Spectacular (2018). In February 2018, Ziegler and her sister appeared on The Slow Mo Guys YouTube channel. She appeared on the cover of the April/May 2018 issue of Girls' Life magazine. Ziegler released a self-help book in May 2018, titled Kenzie's Rules for Life: How to be Happy, Healthy, and Dance to Your Own Beat, "a collection of inspirational, upbeat lessons for kids learning to navigate life." The book ranked No. 7 on the Publishers Weekly best-seller list for juvenile non-fiction. In fall 2018, Ziegler launched her own cosmetics line, "Love, Kenzie".

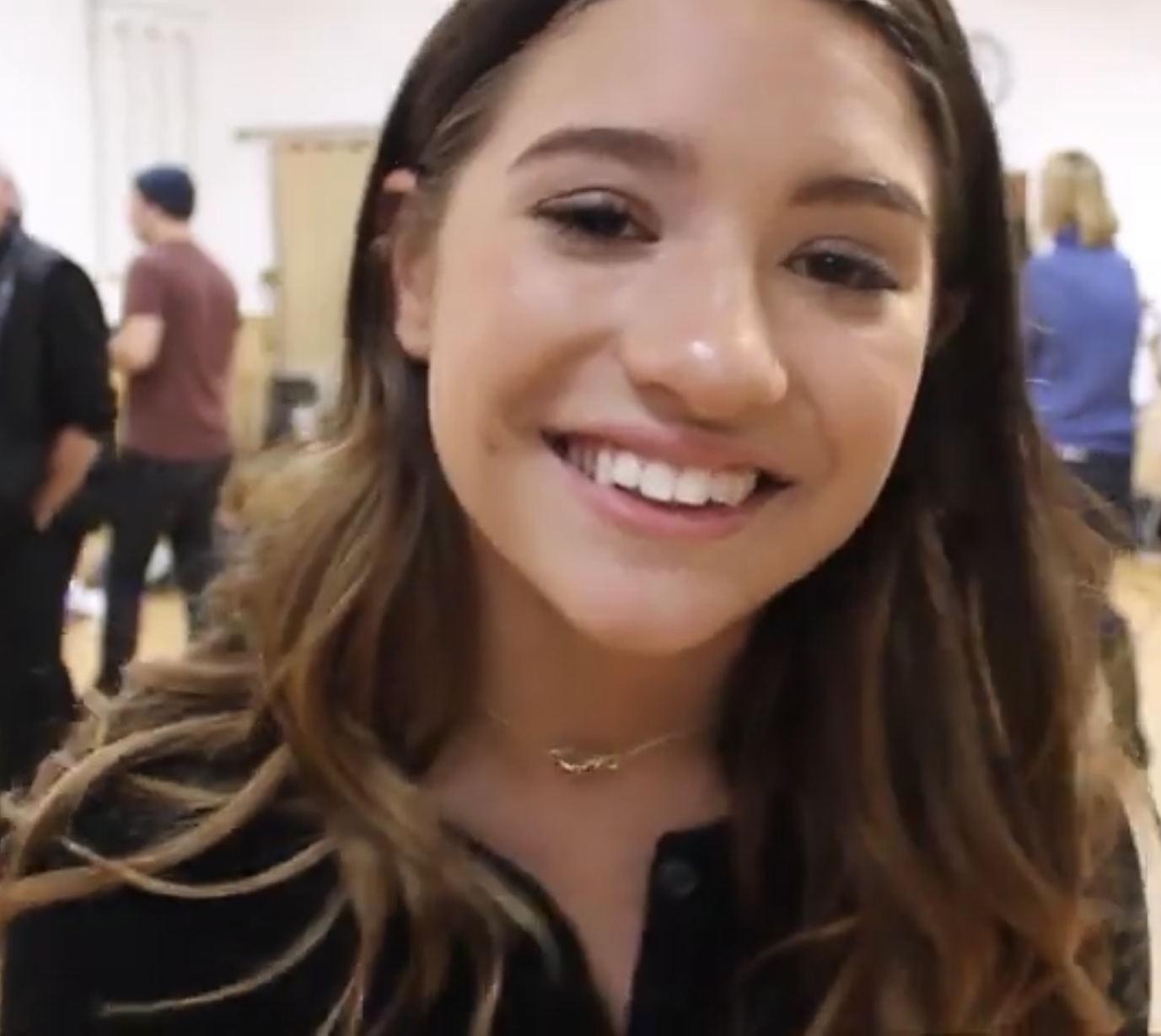
Ziegler in 2018

Ziegler was a contestant on Dancing with the Stars: Juniors in 2018, reaching the finals. On one episode of this show she danced together with her sister for the first time on television since Dance Moms. On November 20, 2018, Ziegler released her second studio album, Phases. One of the singles on the album, "Wonderful", was written by Sia, and Ziegler premiered the song on Dancing with the Stars. In December 2018, Ziegler starred as Dorothy in a holiday stage pantomime adaptation, The Wonderful Winter of Oz, in Pasadena, California. In mid-2019, Ziegler signed with Arista Records and toured the US as the warm-up act for PrettyMuch. She stars as the title character in an animated film, released in the US in November 2019 with the American title Ice Princess Lily, about an ice princess who befriends a dragon to defeat the evil snowman who rules her land.

Ziegler and her sister were guest judges in 2020 on the Quibi dance competition show Floored. She duetted with Sia on Ziegler's song "Exhale", released in June 2020. In 2020–2021, Ziegler competed on The Masked Singer spin-off The Masked Dancer as "Tulip", finishing in third place. In 2023, she and her sister launched a back-to-school fashion collection with American Eagle Outfitters.

=== 2024–present: Biting My Tongue ===
Ziegler released an album, Biting My Tongue, on July 26, 2024, which she says she wrote as "a form of therapy". From October 2024 to May 2025, she opened for Mark Ambor on his Rockwood tour. She released an EP, Notes from the In Between, on April 10, 2026.

From September to November 2026, Ziegler appears in her Broadway debut in the featured ensemble role of Charmion in & Juliet.

== Philanthropy ==
In 2012, Ziegler, along with her mother and sister, partnered with Starlight Children's Foundation to help raise awareness for chronically ill youth. Ziegler has also partnered with foundations such as Love Your Melon and Dancers Against Cancer to raise awareness and funding for childhood cancer. In 2016, Ziegler and her sister made a public service announcement for DoSomething.org's Birthday Mail campaign, which enables people to send homemade birthday cards to children living in homeless shelters. The same organization placed the Ziegler sisters on their 2016 list of charitable young celebrities. Ziegler has also joined her sister to support Dancers Against Cancer.

In 2018, Ziegler performed at the first We Day Alberta in Edmonton, Alberta, Canada. She appeared on Celebrity Family Feud in 2019 together with her sister, mother, aunt and dancer Charlize Glass, playing for "My Friend's Place", where they have volunteered in the past, which provides meals for homeless youth in Los Angeles.

== Reception and accolades ==
As of 2025, Ziegler's Instagram account, "Kenzie", has more than 14 million followers, she has more than 23 million followers on TikTok, her two YouTube channels have received a total of more than 500 million views, with more than 3 million subscribers on her main channel, and she has more than one million Twitter followers under her nickname, "Kenzie". Refinery29 included her on its 2017 list of 29 young actors, singers and activists "on the verge of superstardom." The same year, Tiger Beat named her to its annual list of "19 Under 19". Ziegler won the 2018 Teen Choice Awards for Choice Muser.

== Discography ==
=== Albums ===
Title	Details
Mack Z (as Mack Z)	Released: April 26, 2014; Label: Kismet Music Inc; Formats: Digital download, streaming
Phases	Released: November 20, 2018; Label: Independent; Formats: Digital download, streaming
Biting My Tongue	Released: July 26, 2024; Label: Hollywood Records; Formats: Digital download, streaming

== Filmography ==
=== Television and film ===
Year	Title	Role	Notes
2011–2016	Dance Moms	Herself	Main role (season 1–6)
2011	Dance Moms: Most Outrageous Moments	Herself	TV movie documentary
2013	Abby's Ultimate Dance Competition	Herself	Episode: Gods and Mortals
2013	Dance Moms Christmas Special	Herself	TV movie
2014	The Today Show	Herself	Performed her single "Girl Party"
2014	Abby's Studio Rescue	Herself	Episode: Delusions of Dance Grandeur
2014	Good Day New York	Herself	Performed her single "Girl Party"
2015	Dance Moms Slumber Party	Herself	TV movie
2015	The Today Show	Herself	
2015	Nicky, Ricky, Dicky & Dawn	Lilly	2 episodes
2015	The View	Herself/Performer	
2016	Dance Moms: The Girls' Guide to Life	Herself/Performer	TV-mini series
2016	So You Think You Can Dance	Herself/Performer	
2017	Nicky, Ricky, Dicky & Dawn	Lilly	Episode: "Keeping Up with the Quadashians"
2018	Dancing with the Stars	Herself/Singer	Guest artist, performing her song "Wonderful"
2018	Dancing with the Stars: Juniors	Herself/Singer	Contestant
2018	Brat Holiday Spectacular	Cassie	Lead role, holiday special
2018–2020	Total Eclipse	Cassie	Lead role
2019	Celebrity Family Feud	Contestant for charity	
2019	Ice Princess Lily	Princess Lily	Voice
2020	The Masked Dancer	Tulip/Herself	Contestant
2021	Let Us In	Ivy	Independent film
2025	Shakey Grounds	Lisa	
2025	She Dances	Kat	Independent film

=== Stage ===
Year	Title	Role	Notes
2018	The Wonderful Winter of Oz	Dorothy	Pasadena
2026	& Juliet	Charmion	Broadway

=== Music videos ===
Year	Title	Lead performer	Notes
2011	"It's Like Summer"	LUX	Supporting
2012	"Summer Love Song"	Brooke Hyland	Supporting
2014	"Girl Party"	Mackenzie Ziegler	Lead
2014	"Freaks Like Me"	Todrick Hall	Supporting, vocals
2014	"Shine"	Mackenzie Ziegler	Lead
2014	"Christmas All Year Long"	Mackenzie Ziegler	Lead
2015	"I Gotta Dance"	Mackenzie Ziegler	Episode: "The Girl with the Curl"
2015	"Dance Moms: Masterpiece"	Jessie J	Supporting
2016	"I Gotta Dance (Dave Aude Remix)"	Mackenzie Ziegler	Lead
2016	"Day & Night"	Johnny Orlando and Mackenzie Ziegler	Lead; first song released as "Mackenzie Ziegler"
2017	"Monsters (aka Haters)"	Mackenzie Ziegler	Lead
2017	"Riding Free"	Maisy Stella	Supporting
2017	"Teamwork"	Mackenzie Ziegler	Lead; created for Justice
2017	"Breathe"	Mackenzie Ziegler	Lead
2018	"What If"	Johnny Orlando and Mackenzie Ziegler	Lead
2018	"Nothing On Us"	Mackenzie Ziegler	Lead
2018	"Wonderful"	Mackenzie Ziegler	Lead with dancer Sage Rosen
2019	"Hot"	Mackenzie Ziegler	Lead
2020	"Exhale"	Mackenzie Ziegler	Lead
2020	"Donuts"	Mackenzie Ziegler (ft. Yung Bae)	Lead
2020	"Cozy With Me"	Mackenzie Ziegler (ft. Ant Saunders)	Co-lead
2021	"happy for me"	Mackenzie Ziegler	Lead
2022	"Worst Thing"	NOTD (ft. Kenzie)	Lead
2022	"100 Degrees"	Mackenzie Ziegler	Lead
2023	"sickly sweet"	Mackenzie Ziegler	Lead
2023	"Anatomy"	Mackenzie Ziegler	Lead
2024	"face to face"	Mackenzie Ziegler	Lead
2024	"Word Vomit"	Mackenzie Ziegler	Lead
2024	"Close to You"	Mackenzie Ziegler feat. ASTN	Lead
2026	"Sophie"	Mackenzie Ziegler	Lead

== Tours ==
Headlining

- The Ziegler Girls 2017 tour of Australia (with Maddie Ziegler)
- Day & Night Tour with Johnny Orlando (2017)
- Maddie & Mackenzie Australia & New Zealand Tour 2018 (with Maddie Ziegler)

Opening act

- FOMO tour (2019; PrettyMuch)
- Rockwood tour (2024; Mark Ambor)

== Awards and nominations ==
Year	Award	Category	Result	Ref.
2016	Teen Choice Awards	Choice Muser	Nominated	
2017	Industry Dance Awards	Favorite Dancer 17 & Under	Nominated	
2018	Teen Choice Awards	Choice Muser	Won	
2019	Teen Choice Awards	Choice Fashion/Beauty Web Star	Nominated	

== See also ==
- List of dancers
