= Johnny Orlando =

Canadian pop singer (born 2003)

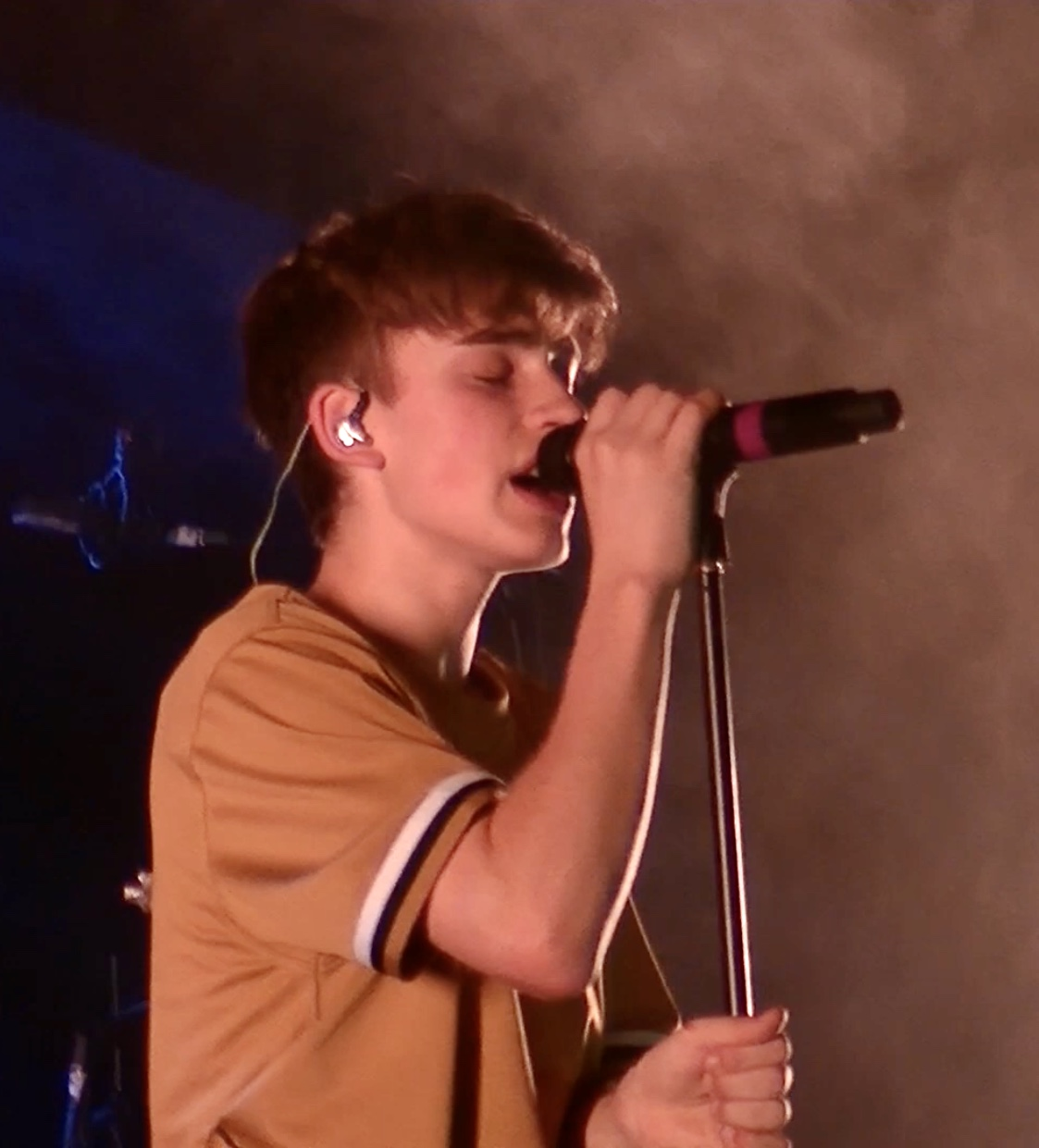
- Orlando performing in 2019

Background information
- Born: John Vincent Orlando; January 24, 2003 (age 23); Mississauga, Ontario, Canada
- Genres: Pop; teen pop; dance pop
- Occupations: Singer; actor
- Years active: 2011–present
- Labels: Universal Music Canada; Republic
- Website: johnnyorlandomusic.com

John Vincent Orlando (born January 24, 2003) is a Canadian singer-songwriter, and actor. He first received attention on social media by posting covers of pop songs by artists such as Austin Mahone, Taylor Swift, Rihanna, Justin Bieber, and Shawn Mendes to his YouTube channel. In 2019, Orlando was nominated for the Juno Award for Breakthrough Artist of the Year. He has also won an MTV Europe Music Award for Best Canadian Act four times in 2019, 2020, 2021, and 2022.

Orlando's debut studio album All the Things That Could Go Wrong was released on August 19, 2022.

== Biography ==
Johnny Orlando was born in Mississauga, Ontario on January 24, 2003.

His sister Darian made a YouTube channel for Johnny, "JohnnyOsings" on December 5, 2011, and posted a cover of him singing "Mistletoe". Orlando and his sister recorded it in their bathroom because their bathroom had good acoustics. Initially, they expected at most 100 views, but to their surprise, the video went viral and got more than 100,000 views in a month. Citing the initial success of the first video, he and his sister continued posting covers of famous musical artists like Justin Bieber, Shawn Mendes, Taylor Swift, Austin Mahone, and Selena Gomez on his YouTube channel while Darian directed, shot, produced and edited all his videos.

His debut EP, VXIIXI was released in 2015 when he was 12 years old. In 2017, a YouTube video was posted by Glamour showing P!nk viewing his cover of her song “Just Give Me a Reason”, in which the singer noted he had “incredible voice control.” He signed with Universal Music Canada on May 18, 2018, and has released singles such as "Day and Night" and "What If" (both featuring Mackenzie Ziegler), "Last Summer", "Waste My Time", "All These Parties", "Phobias", "See You" and "Everybody Wants You". His second EP, Teenage Fever, was released on March 15, 2019. Orlando embarked on his second headlining North American tour in support of the EP, beginning on April 29, 2019, in Chicago and ending on May 22, 2019, in Vancouver. It was supported by his close friends Hayden Summerall and Gus McMillan.

It was announced that MTV had signed a deal for consumer products with Orlando at the end of July 2020. On October 23, 2020, he announced his third EP, It's Never Really Over was released.

In 2023, he participated in an all-star recording of Serena Ryder's single "What I Wouldn't Do", which was released as a charity single to benefit Kids Help Phone's Feel Out Loud campaign for youth mental health.

Orlando has cited Justin Bieber and Shawn Mendes among his primary musical inspirations. He is also inspired by Billie Eilish as well as other Canadian artists such as Drake, The Weeknd, and Alessia Cara. Orlando has also shared that his dad played Pearl Jam and Otis Redding in the car, which helped cultivate his songwriting skills.

== Discography ==
=== Albums ===
- All the Things That Could Go Wrong (2022)
- Songs for Young Lovers (2026)

=== EPs ===
- VXIIXI (2015)
- Teenage Fever (2019)
- It's Never Really Over (2020)
- The Ride (2024)

=== Singles ===
Single	Year	Peak chart positions				Certifications	Album
Single	Year	CAN	CAN AC	CAN CHR	CAN Hot AC	Certifications	Album
"Let Go"	2016	—	—	—	—		Non-album singles
"Day & Night" (with Mackenzie Ziegler)	2016	—	—	—	—		Non-album singles
"Missing You"	2016	—	—	—	—		Non-album singles
"Thinking About You"	2017	—	—	—	—		Non-album singles
"Everything"	2017	—	—	—	—		Non-album singles
"The Most"	2017	—	—	—	—		Non-album singles
"What If (I Told You I Like You)" (with Mackenzie Ziegler)	2018	—	—	—	—	MC: Gold	Non-album singles
"Last Summer"	2018	—	—	—	—		Teenage Fever
"Sleep"	2019	—	—	—	—		Teenage Fever
"Piece of my Heart"	2019	—	—	—	—		Teenage Fever
"All These Parties"	2019	—	—	—	—		Non-album singles
"Mistletoe"	2019	—	—	—	—		Non-album singles
"Phobias"	2020	—	—	—	—		It's Never Really Over
"Lean On Me" (with ArtistsCAN)	2020	13	6	15	11		Non-album single
"See You"	2020	—	—	—	—		It's Never Really Over
"Everybody Wants You"	2020	61	14	20	14	MC: Gold	It's Never Really Over
"Last Christmas"	2020	—	—	—	—		Non-album single
"Adelaide"	2020	—	—	—	—		It's Never Really Over
"I Don't" (with Dvbbs)	2021	—	—	46	—		Non-album singles
"Daydream"	2021	—	—	40	—		Non-album singles
"It's Alright"	2021	—	—	—	—		My Little Pony: A New Generation
"You're Just Drunk"	2021	—	—	—	—		All the Things That Could Go Wrong
"How Can It Be Christmas"	2021	—	—	—	—		Non-album single
"Someone Will Love You Better"	2022	—	—	—	—		All the Things That Could Go Wrong
"Blur"	2022	—	—	—	—		All the Things That Could Go Wrong
"Fun Out of It" (with Benee)	2022	—	—	—	—		All the Things That Could Go Wrong
"If He Wanted to He Would"	2022	—	—	—	—		All the Things That Could Go Wrong
"When I'm Gone" (with Ali Gatie)	2023	—	—	—	—		Non-album single
"Anywhere with You"	2023	—	—	—	—		Butterfly Tale
"Boyfriend"	2023	—	—	—	—		The Ride
"July"	2023	—	—	—	—		The Ride
"A Man Like Me"	2023	—	—	—	—		The Ride
"Party for Two"	2023	—	—	—	—		The Ride
"Close to You"	2023	—	—	—	—		The Ride
"Thinking of Me"	2023	—	—	—	—		The Ride
"Wait for You"	2024	—	—	—	—		Non-album singles
"Untouched" (with Toby Gad)	2024	—	—	—	—		Non-album singles
"Temptation"	2024	—	—	—	—		Non-album singles
"Famous"	2025	—	—	—	—		Non-album singles
"What I Am"	2025	—	—	—	—		Non-album singles
"The Crowd"	2025	—	—	—	—		Songs for Young Lovers
"Emilia"	2026	—	—	—	—		Songs for Young Lovers
"Have Your Lovin'"	2026	—	—	—	—		Songs for Young Lovers
"Charlotte"	2026	—	—	—	—		Songs for Young Lovers
"Heads Up"	2026	—	—	—	—		Songs for Young Lovers
"Novice"	2026	—	—	—	—		Like We're Lovers
"Praying Mantis (If You Love Me to Death)"	2026	—	—	—	—		Like We're Lovers
"—" denotes a recording that did not chart.

=== Collaborations ===
- "Big Like You" (2017) (Bunyan & Babe soundtracks)
- "Christmas Fever" (2017) (with Bars and Melody)
- "We Change the World" (2017) (with Raina Harten)
- "Keep On Trying" (2018) (with Sylwia PrzyBysz)

=== Web ===
Year	Series	Role	Notes
2018–2020	Total Eclipse	Sam	Main role
2018	Chicken Girls	Sam	Episode: "Seven Minutes in Heaven"
2018	Baby Doll Records	Sam	Episode: "Work from Home"

== Filmography ==
List of performances and appearances by Johnny Orlando in television, film and on the web
Year	Title	Role	Notes/Ref.
2014–2019	Wishenpoof!	Oliver	Voice
2015–2016	Super Why!	Whyatt Beanstalk/Super Why	Voice (season 3)
2017	Bunyan and Babe	Travis Barclay	Voice
2018	Pinocchio	Pinocchio	Voice, English version
2018–2020	Total Eclipse	Sam	
2020	The Substitute	Himself (substitute teacher)	
2020	All That	Himself (guest performer)	Season 11
2020	Group Chat with Annie & Jayden	Himself	
2020	For the Record: The Broken Hearts Tour	Himself	
2021	Nickelodeon's Unfiltered	Himself	

== Awards and nominations ==
Name of the award ceremony, year presented, nominee(s) of the award, award category, and the result of the nomination
Award ceremony	Year	Category	Nominee(s)/work(s)	Result	Ref.
Juno Awards	2019	Breakthrough Artist of the Year	Johnny Orlando	Nominated	
Juno Awards	2021	Pop Album of the Year	It's Never Really Over	Nominated	
Nickelodeon Kids' Choice Awards	2017	Favorite Viral Music Artist	Johnny Orlando	Nominated	
Nickelodeon Kids' Choice Awards	2018	Favorite Musical YT Creator	Johnny Orlando	Nominated	
Nickelodeon Kids' Choice Awards	2020	Favorite Social Music Star	Johnny Orlando	Nominated	
Nickelodeon Kids' Choice Awards	2022	Favorite Social Music Star	Johnny Orlando	Nominated	
MTV Europe Music Awards	2019	Best Canadian Act	Johnny Orlando	Won	
MTV Europe Music Awards	2020	Best Canadian Act	Johnny Orlando	Won	
MTV Europe Music Awards	2021	Best Canadian Act	Johnny Orlando	Won	
MTV Europe Music Awards	2022	Best Canadian Act	Johnny Orlando	Won	
Teen Choice Awards	2016	Choice Music Web Star	Johnny Orlando	Nominated	
Teen Choice Awards	2019	Choice Music Web Star	Johnny Orlando	Nominated	
