= Jim Clifton =

American businessman

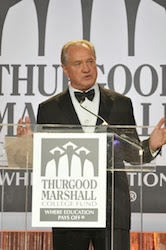
- Jim Clifton at the Thurgood Marshall College Fund Gala in 2013
- Occupations: Chairman and CEO of Gallup
- Notable work: It's the Manager
- Website: Official website

Jim Clifton is the chairman of Gallup, a global analytics and advice firm. Clifton served as the CEO of Gallup from 1988 until 2022, and is the author of the #1 Wall Street Journal bestseller It's the Manager, the bestseller Born to Build, The Coming Jobs War, and writes The Chairman's Blog. He is the creator of the behavioral economic framework, “The Gallup Microeconomic Path,” a metric-based economic model that establishes the linkages among human nature in the workplace, customer engagement and business outcomes, which is used by over 500 companies worldwide. His father was psychologist, educator, and author Dr. Donald O. Clifton, who founded of Selection Research, Inc. (SRI). Under Jim's leadership, SRI acquired the Gallup Organization in 1988.

== Books by James K. Clifton ==
It's the Manager equips managers with 52 discoveries from Gallup's largest study on the future of work and decades of research into the science of management. In It's the Manager, Clifton and co-author, Gallup Chief Scientist of Workplace Management and Wellbeing, Jim Harter discuss adapting organizations to rapid change, ranging from new workplace demands to managing remote employees, a diverse workforce, the rise of artificial intelligence, gig workers, and attracting today's best employees.

Born to Build attempts to inspire entrepreneurs and ambitious, self-motivated people to build something that will change the world—a small business that grows into a mammoth enterprise, a thriving new division in an existing company, a nonprofit, a social enterprise or a church—anything that makes a lasting impact. Written with Dr. Sangeeta Badal, the principal scientist for Gallup's Entrepreneurship and Job Creation initiative, Born to Build coaches entrepreneurs to create self-awareness, recognize opportunities, activate on ideas, and build a team.

The Coming Jobs War describes how the universal desire of the workforce—to have “a good job”—affects all leadership decisions in countries, cities, businesses, schools, and government. As Clifton writes, leaders go as jobs go, so does the fate of nations. And the cities and countries that focus everything they have on creating good jobs are the ones that will win.

== Major research initiatives while at Gallup ==
The Gallup World Poll Clifton and Gallup launched the Gallup World Poll in 2005 "to measure the will of every person on Earth." The Gallup World Poll tracks the important issues worldwide, such as food access, employment, leadership performance, and well-being. Gallup has conducted studies in more than 160 countries that include 99% of the world's adult population.

Gallup Center on Black Voices Launched in the spring of 2020, The Center on Black Voices is Gallup's research initiative devoted to studying and highlighting the experiences of more than 40 million Black Americans: tracking and reporting on progress on life outcomes and a life well-lived.

== Thurgood Marshall College Fund ==
Clifton is chairman emeritus of the Thurgood Marshall College Fund. The Thurgood Marshall College Fund (TMCF) is an American non-profit organization that supports and represents nearly 300,000 students attending its 47 member-schools that include public Historically Black Colleges and Universities (HBCUs), medical schools and law schools.

== Clifton Foundation ==
In June 2015, the Clifton Foundation and Gallup, announced a $30 million gift to the University of Nebraska to establish the Don Clifton Strengths Institute. The gift will support the early identification and accelerated development of thousands of gifted entrepreneurs and future business builders.

== Recognition ==
Clifton is a distinguished visiting professor at UNC-Chapel Hill and Duke University. He serves on several boards and is chairman emeritus of the Thurgood Marshall College Fund. He has received honorary degrees from Medgar Evers, Jackson State and Bellevue Universities.

== Personal life ==
Clifton is married to Susan Clifton and lives in Washington D.C.
