= The Coming Jobs War =

Book by Jim Clifton

- Author: Jim Clifton
- Published: 2011
- Publisher: Gallup Press
- Pages: 220 pp.
- ISBN: 978-0-385-34994-9

The Coming Jobs War is a book by Gallup Chairman Jim Clifton.

Clifton claims that a lack of innovation is not the problem, but rather a lack of entrepreneurship.

== Reviews ==
Deepak Chopra wrote that The Coming Jobs War is "excellent and timely" and Charles M. Blow in the New York Times commenting the book is "fascinating – and frightening."
