= Thomas Rath =

Thomas Rath may refer to:

- Thomas D. Rath, American lawyer and former Attorney General of New Hampshire
- Thomas Rath (footballer) (born 1970), German football midfielder
- Tom Rath (born 1975), American business consultant
