= Wellbeing: The Five Essential Elements =

Wellbeing: The Five Essential Elements is a book by Tom Rath and Jim Harter.
