= CliftonStrengths =

Psychometric test

CliftonStrengths (also known as StrengthsFinder) is an assessment developed by Don Clifton while he was chairman of Gallup, Inc. The company launched the test in 2001. Test takers are presented with paired statements and select the option they more strongly identify with, then receive a report outlining the five strength areas they scored highest in.

- Influencing: Activator, Command, Communication, Competition, Maximizer, Self-assurance, Significance, Woo;
- Relationship Building: Adaptability, Connectedness, Developer, Empathy, Harmony, Includer, Individualization, Positivity, Relator;
- Strategic Thinking: Analytical, Context, Futuristic, Ideation, Input, Intellection, Learner, Strategic;

Between 2001 and 2012, approximately 600,000 people took the test annually. By 2015, 1.6 million people were taking it each year. The Wall Street Journal reported in 2015 that 467 companies on the Fortune 500 list were using CliftonStrengths. As of 2022, more than 26 million people had taken the test.

Gallup released StrengthsFinder 2.0 in 2007. The book became one of Amazon's top-ten best selling books and remained on that list through 2016.

== Evidence ==
The Clifton Strengths Assessment has been cited in several academic publications.
