= Gallup's most admired man and woman poll =

Annual opinion poll in the United States

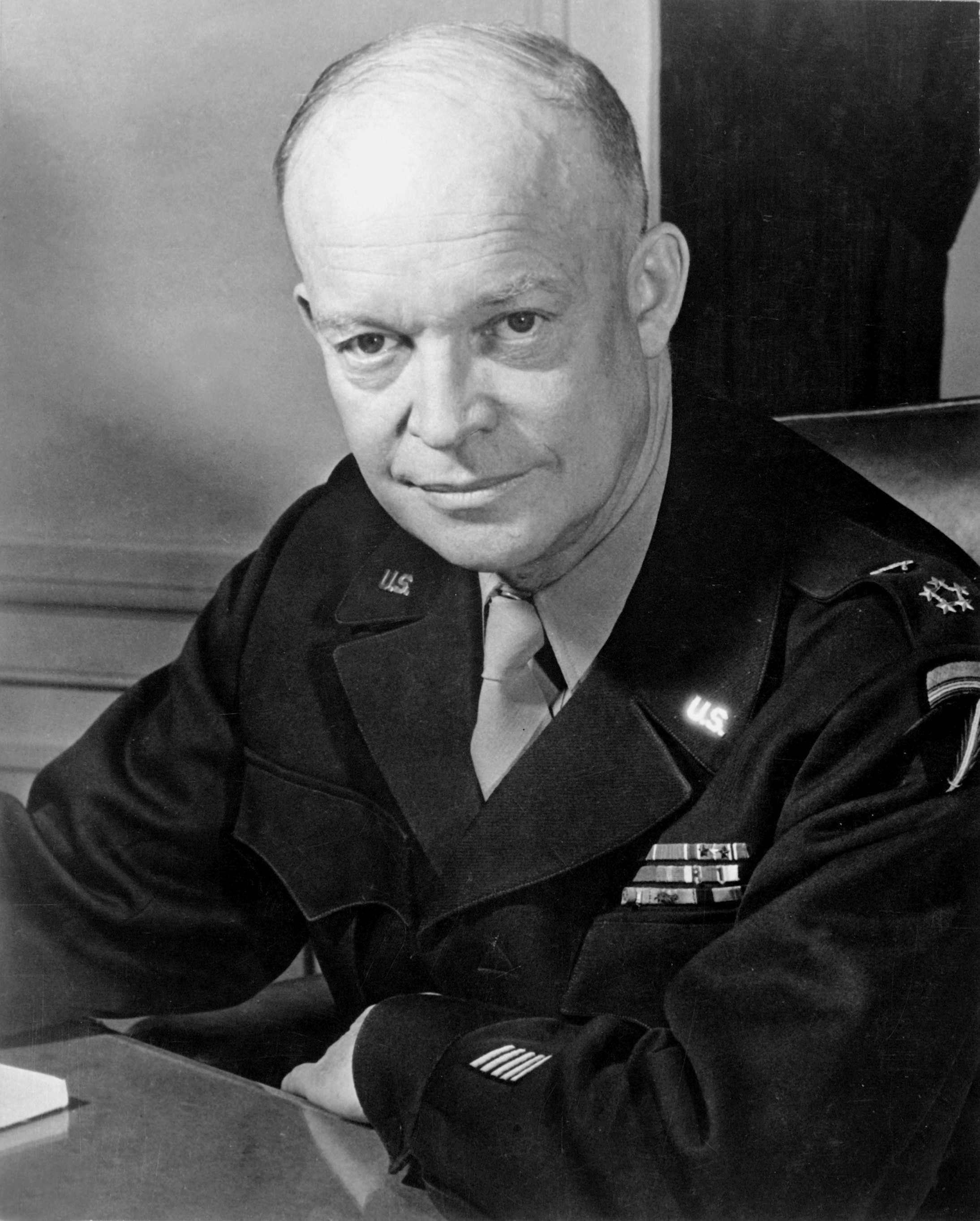
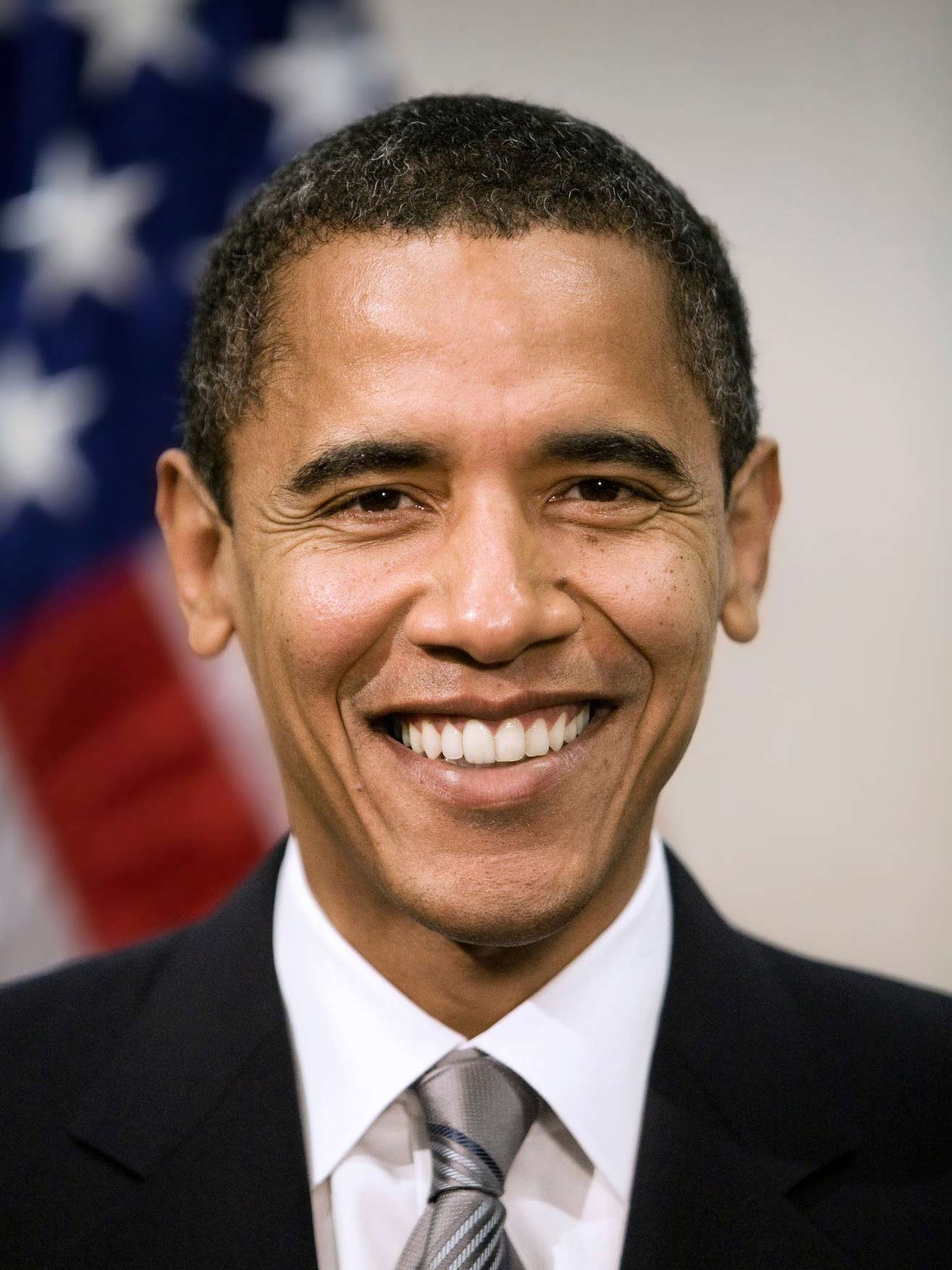
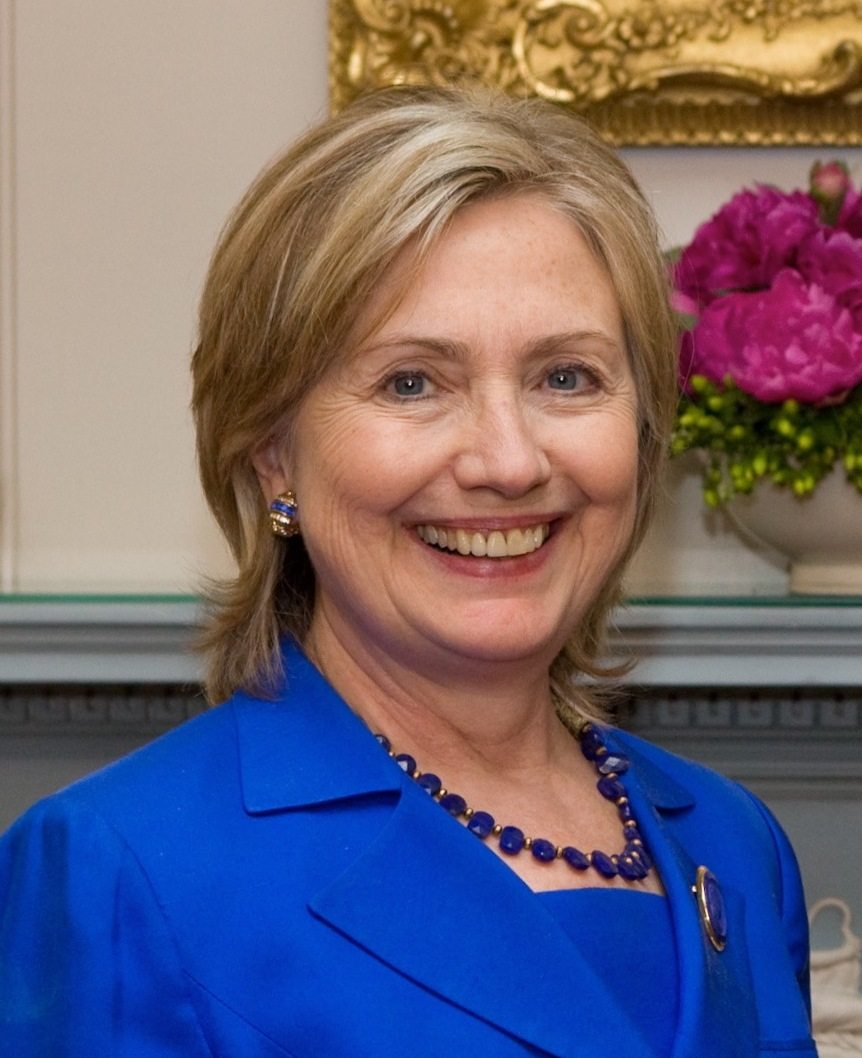
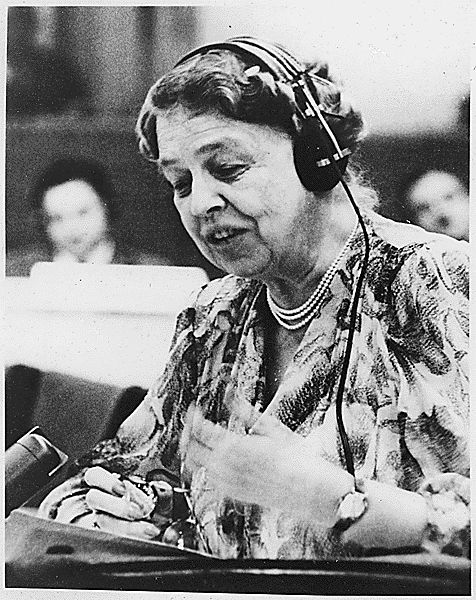
Dwight D. Eisenhower (top left) and Barack Obama (top right) have each been the most admired man 12 times. Hillary Clinton (bottom left) has been the most admired woman 22 times, and Eleanor Roosevelt (bottom right) has been the most admired woman 13 times.

Gallup, an American analytics and advisory company, conducted an annual opinion poll to determine the most admired man and woman in the United States at the end of most years from 1946 to 2020. Americans are asked, without prompting, to say which man and woman "living today in any part of the world" they admire the most. The results of the poll were published as a top ten list. In most years, the most admired man was the incumbent president of the United States, and the most admired woman was the first lady.

The incumbent president was the most admired man in 58 of the 72 years in which the poll was conducted. Dwight D. Eisenhower and Barack Obama have each been the most admired man 12 times. In his lifetime, the evangelist Billy Graham had 61 appearances in the top-ten list, the most of any individual, and 8 second-place finishes. Other men with many appearances are Ronald Reagan (31), Jimmy Carter (28), and Pope John Paul II (27). The incumbent pope has finished in the top-ten list every year since 1977. The survey has been considered, in part, to be a test of name recognition. While the top of the list is often predictable, scholars have found appearances further down in the top ten to be illuminating. For instance, in 1958, Governor Orval Faubus of Arkansas, a segregationist, appeared on the list in the wake of the Little Rock Nine civil-rights episode. A portion of those surveyed have chosen a friend or relative instead of a public figure.

Three former first ladies have had the most appearances as the most admired woman: Eleanor Roosevelt and Hillary Clinton. In the late 1940s and 1950s, Roosevelt was an ambassador to the United Nations, serving as the chair of the United Nations Commission on Human Rights and leading the drafting of the Universal Declaration of Human Rights, and was widely referred to as the "First Lady of the World". Clinton served as the first lady from 1993 to 2001, a senator from New York, the secretary of state, and was the first American female presidential nominee of either of the two major American political parties when she ran in the 2016 presidential election. Clinton topped the list in 22 of the 25 polls conducted during between 1993 and 2017, including 16 times in a row from 2002 to 2017, before Michelle Obama became the most admired woman in 2018. Jackie Kennedy Onassis became an icon globally for her work as a cultural ambassador of the United States and was named most admired woman for 4 years.

Roosevelt was named the most admired woman 13 times. The highest number of top-ten appearances belongs to Queen Elizabeth II, with 52. Despite never winning, broadcaster Oprah Winfrey has finished in the top ten a total of 33 times, including finishing second 14 times.

There were two ties for the top position in the poll: in 1980, Mother Teresa and Rosalynn Carter tied for the most admired woman, and in 2019, Barack Obama and Donald Trump shared the title of most admired man. For the years 1946 and 1947, the "most admired person" was asked; the "most admired woman" was not asked in 1967. No poll was conducted in 1976. The poll was last conducted in 2020, although Gallup has made no announcement about terminating the poll permanently.

== Most admired man and woman ==
List of winners of Gallup's most admired man and woman poll
Year	Most admired man		Most admired woman		Ref.
Year	Portrait	Name	Portrait	Name	Ref.
1946	Photographic portrait of Douglas MacArthur	Douglas MacArthur	Not answered (Note: The question asked was to specify the "most admired person".)		
1947	Photographic portrait of Douglas MacArthur	Douglas MacArthur	Not answered		
1948	Photographic portrait of Harry S. Truman	Harry S. Truman	Black-and-white photographic portrait of Eleanor Roosevelt	Eleanor Roosevelt	
1949	Photographic portrait of Harry S. Truman	Harry S. Truman	Black-and-white photographic portrait of Eleanor Roosevelt	Eleanor Roosevelt	
1950	Photographic portrait of Dwight D. Eisenhower	Dwight D. Eisenhower	Black-and-white photographic portrait of Eleanor Roosevelt	Eleanor Roosevelt	
1951	Photographic portrait of Douglas MacArthur	Douglas MacArthur	Black-and-white photographic portrait of Elizabeth Kenny	Elizabeth Kenny	
1952	Photographic portrait of Dwight D. Eisenhower	Dwight D. Eisenhower	Black-and-white photographic portrait of Eleanor Roosevelt	Eleanor Roosevelt	
1953	Photographic portrait of Dwight D. Eisenhower	Dwight D. Eisenhower	Black-and-white photographic portrait of Eleanor Roosevelt	Eleanor Roosevelt	
1954	Photographic portrait of Dwight D. Eisenhower	Dwight D. Eisenhower	Black-and-white photographic portrait of Eleanor Roosevelt	Eleanor Roosevelt	
1955	Photographic portrait of Dwight D. Eisenhower	Dwight D. Eisenhower	Black-and-white photographic portrait of Eleanor Roosevelt	Eleanor Roosevelt	
1956	Photographic portrait of Dwight D. Eisenhower	Dwight D. Eisenhower	Black-and-white photographic portrait of Eleanor Roosevelt	Eleanor Roosevelt	
1957	Photographic portrait of Dwight D. Eisenhower	Dwight D. Eisenhower	Black-and-white photographic portrait of Eleanor Roosevelt	Eleanor Roosevelt	
1958	Photographic portrait of Dwight D. Eisenhower	Dwight D. Eisenhower	Black-and-white photographic portrait of Eleanor Roosevelt	Eleanor Roosevelt	
1959	Photographic portrait of Dwight D. Eisenhower	Dwight D. Eisenhower	Black-and-white photographic portrait of Eleanor Roosevelt	Eleanor Roosevelt	
1960	Photographic portrait of Dwight D. Eisenhower	Dwight D. Eisenhower	Black-and-white photographic portrait of Eleanor Roosevelt	Eleanor Roosevelt	
1961	Black-and-white photographic portrait of John F. Kennedy	John F. Kennedy	Black-and-white photographic portrait of Eleanor Roosevelt	Eleanor Roosevelt	
1962	Black-and-white photographic portrait of John F. Kennedy	John F. Kennedy	Photographic portrait of Jacqueline Kennedy	Jacqueline Kennedy Onassis	
1963	Photographic portrait of Lyndon B. Johnson	Lyndon B. Johnson	Photographic portrait of Jacqueline Kennedy	Jacqueline Kennedy Onassis	
1964	Photographic portrait of Lyndon B. Johnson	Lyndon B. Johnson	Photographic portrait of Jacqueline Kennedy	Jacqueline Kennedy Onassis	
1965	Photographic portrait of Lyndon B. Johnson	Lyndon B. Johnson	Photographic portrait of Jacqueline Kennedy	Jacqueline Kennedy Onassis	
1966	Photographic portrait of Lyndon B. Johnson	Lyndon B. Johnson	Photographic portrait of Jacqueline Kennedy	Jacqueline Kennedy Onassis	
1967	Photographic portrait of Dwight D. Eisenhower	Dwight D. Eisenhower	Not asked		
1968	Photographic portrait of Dwight D. Eisenhower	Dwight D. Eisenhower	Black-and-white photographic portrait of Ethel Kennedy	Ethel Kennedy	
1969	Photographic portrait of Richard Nixon	Richard Nixon	Black-and-white photographic portrait of Mamie Eisenhower	Mamie Eisenhower	
1970	Photographic portrait of Richard Nixon	Richard Nixon	Black-and-white photographic portrait of Mamie Eisenhower	Mamie Eisenhower	
1971	Photographic portrait of Richard Nixon	Richard Nixon	Black-and-white photographic portrait of Golda Meir	Golda Meir	
1972	Photographic portrait of Richard Nixon	Richard Nixon	Photographic portrait of Pat Nixon	Pat Nixon	
1973	Black-and-white photographic portrait of Henry Kissinger	Henry Kissinger	Black-and-white photographic portrait of Golda Meir	Golda Meir	
1974	Black-and-white photographic portrait of Henry Kissinger	Henry Kissinger	Black-and-white photographic portrait of Golda Meir	Golda Meir	
1975	Black-and-white photographic portrait of Henry Kissinger	Henry Kissinger	Photographic portrait of Betty Ford	Betty Ford	
1976	Not asked				—
1977	Photographic portrait of Jimmy Carter	Jimmy Carter	Photographic portrait of Rosalynn Carter	Rosalynn Carter	
1978	Photographic portrait of Jimmy Carter	Jimmy Carter	Photographic portrait of Betty Ford	Betty Ford	
1979	Photographic portrait of Jimmy Carter	Jimmy Carter	Photographic portrait of Rosalynn Carter	Rosalynn Carter	
1980	Photographic portrait of Pope John Paul II	Pope John Paul II	Photographic portrait of Mother Teresa (left) and Rosalynn Carter (right)	Mother Teresa and Rosalynn Carter (tie)	
1981	Photographic portrait of Ronald Reagan	Ronald Reagan	Photographic portrait of Nancy Reagan	Nancy Reagan	
1982	Photographic portrait of Ronald Reagan	Ronald Reagan	Photographic portrait of Margaret Thatcher	Margaret Thatcher	
1983	Photographic portrait of Ronald Reagan	Ronald Reagan	Photographic portrait of Margaret Thatcher	Margaret Thatcher	
1984	Photographic portrait of Ronald Reagan	Ronald Reagan	Photographic portrait of Margaret Thatcher	Margaret Thatcher	
1985	Photographic portrait of Ronald Reagan	Ronald Reagan	Photographic portrait of Nancy Reagan	Nancy Reagan	
1986	Photographic portrait of Ronald Reagan	Ronald Reagan	Photographic portrait of Mother Teresa	Mother Teresa	
1987	Photographic portrait of Ronald Reagan	Ronald Reagan	Photographic portrait of Nancy Reagan	Nancy Reagan	
1988	Photographic portrait of Ronald Reagan	Ronald Reagan	Photographic portrait of Margaret Thatcher	Margaret Thatcher	
1989	Photographic portrait of George H. W. Bush	George H. W. Bush	Photographic portrait of Margaret Thatcher	Margaret Thatcher	
1990	Photographic portrait of George H. W. Bush	George H. W. Bush	Photographic portrait of Margaret Thatcher	Margaret Thatcher	
1991	Photographic portrait of George H. W. Bush	George H. W. Bush	Photographic portrait of Barbara Bush	Barbara Bush	
1992	Photographic portrait of George H. W. Bush	George H. W. Bush	Photographic portrait of Barbara Bush	Barbara Bush	
1993	Photographic portrait of Bill Clinton	Bill Clinton	Photographic portrait of Hillary Clinton	Hillary Clinton	
1994	Photographic portrait of Bill Clinton	Bill Clinton	Photographic portrait of Hillary Clinton	Hillary Clinton	
1995	Photographic portrait of Bill Clinton	Bill Clinton	Photographic portrait of Mother Teresa	Mother Teresa	
1996	Photographic portrait of Bill Clinton	Bill Clinton	Photographic portrait of Mother Teresa	Mother Teresa	
1997	Photographic portrait of Bill Clinton	Bill Clinton	Photographic portrait of Hillary Clinton	Hillary Clinton	
1998	Photographic portrait of Bill Clinton	Bill Clinton	Photographic portrait of Hillary Clinton	Hillary Clinton	
1999	Photographic portrait of Bill Clinton	Bill Clinton	Photographic portrait of Hillary Clinton	Hillary Clinton	
2000	Photographic portrait of Bill Clinton	Bill Clinton	Photographic portrait of Hillary Clinton	Hillary Clinton	
2001	Photographic portrait of George W. Bush	George W. Bush	Photographic portrait of Laura Bush	Laura Bush	
2002	Photographic portrait of George W. Bush	George W. Bush	Photographic portrait of Hillary Clinton	Hillary Clinton	
2003	Photographic portrait of George W. Bush	George W. Bush	Photographic portrait of Hillary Clinton	Hillary Clinton	
2004	Photographic portrait of George W. Bush	George W. Bush	Photographic portrait of Hillary Clinton	Hillary Clinton	
2005	Photographic portrait of George W. Bush	George W. Bush	Photographic portrait of Hillary Clinton	Hillary Clinton	
2006	Photographic portrait of George W. Bush	George W. Bush	Photographic portrait of Hillary Clinton	Hillary Clinton	
2007	Photographic portrait of George W. Bush	George W. Bush	Photographic portrait of Hillary Clinton	Hillary Clinton	
2008	Photographic portrait of Barack Obama	Barack Obama	Photographic portrait of Hillary Clinton	Hillary Clinton	
2009	Photographic portrait of Barack Obama	Barack Obama	Photographic portrait of Hillary Clinton	Hillary Clinton	
2010	Photographic portrait of Barack Obama	Barack Obama	Photographic portrait of Hillary Clinton	Hillary Clinton	
2011	Photographic portrait of Barack Obama	Barack Obama	Photographic portrait of Hillary Clinton	Hillary Clinton	
2012	Photographic portrait of Barack Obama	Barack Obama	Photographic portrait of Hillary Clinton	Hillary Clinton	
2013	Photographic portrait of Barack Obama	Barack Obama	Photographic portrait of Hillary Clinton	Hillary Clinton	
2014	Photographic portrait of Barack Obama	Barack Obama	Photographic portrait of Hillary Clinton	Hillary Clinton	
2015	Photographic portrait of Barack Obama	Barack Obama	Photographic portrait of Hillary Clinton	Hillary Clinton	
2016	Photographic portrait of Barack Obama	Barack Obama	Photographic portrait of Hillary Clinton	Hillary Clinton	
2017	Photographic portrait of Barack Obama	Barack Obama	Photographic portrait of Hillary Clinton	Hillary Clinton	
2018	Photographic portrait of Barack Obama	Barack Obama	Photographic portrait of Michelle Obama	Michelle Obama	
2019	Photographic portrait of Donald Trump (left) and Barack Obama (right)	Barack Obama and Donald Trump (Note: Barack Obama was the first place finisher based on number of mentions.) (tie)	Photographic portrait of Michelle Obama	Michelle Obama	
2020	Photographic portrait of Donald Trump	Donald Trump	Photographic portrait of Michelle Obama	Michelle Obama	

== See also ==
- Gallup's List of Most Widely Admired People of the 20th Century
