= Tom Rath =

American non-fiction writer (born 1975)

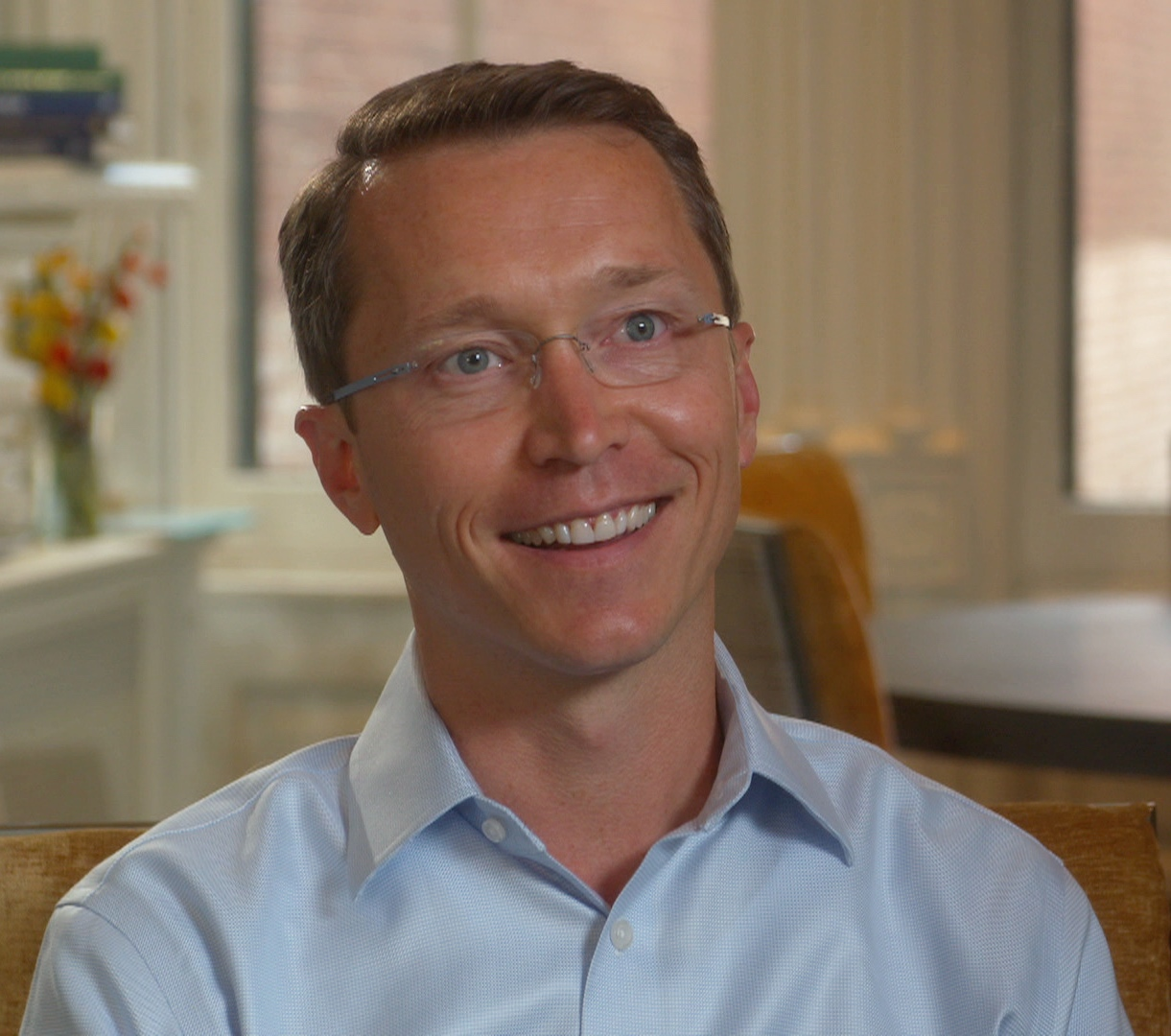
- Born: Thomas Rath; 1975 (age 50–51); Lincoln, Nebraska, U.S.
- Education: M.S. Psychology (University of Pennsylvania); B.A. Psychology (University of Michigan)
- Occupations: Author; researcher; speaker
- Writing career
- Language: English
- Genre: Nonfiction
- Subjects: Business; health; wellbeing
- Notable works: Strengths Based Leadership, StrengthsFinder 2.0, How Full Is Your Bucket?, Wellbeing
- Website: tomrath.org

Tom Rath (born 1975) is an American author and a consultant on employee engagement, strengths, and well-being. He is best known for his studies on strength-based leadership and well-being and for synthesizing research findings in a series of bestselling books. His books have sold more than five million copies and have been translated into 16 languages.

== Biography ==
Rath was born in 1975 in Lincoln, Nebraska. He holds a B.A. in Psychology degree from the University of Michigan in Ann Arbor, and an M.S. in Psychology degree from the University of Pennsylvania in Philadelphia.

After graduating from Penn, Rath started working at Gallup, Inc., where he participates as a senior scientist, consultant, and advisor. He served as vice chairman of the VHL cancer research organization and is a regular guest lecturer at the University of Pennsylvania.

== Work ==
=== Writing career ===
Rath's first book, How Full Is Your Bucket?, coauthored with his grandfather, Donald O. Clifton, during Clifton's final year of life, became a New York Times bestseller in 2004. The book aims to teach children the value of "filling your bucket" and that people should also value every moment.

Strengths Based Leadership (2009), co-authored with Barry Conchie, is based on Rath's and Gallup's research on leadership and on what followers expect from their leaders (trust, compassion, stability, and hope). Wellbeing: The Five Essential Elements (2010), a New York Times bestseller, coauthored with Jim Harter, is based on Gallup's research on wellbeing. The book lists five elements of well-being: career well-being, social well-being, financial well-being, community well-being, and physical well-being.

Rath's most well-known book, StrengthsFinder 2.0 (2007), a #1 Wall Street Journal bestseller, was listed as the top worldwide business bestseller by The Economist in 2011. It suggests that employees and employers should develop their unique skills rather than spend time improving their weaknesses.

=== Eat Move Sleep ===
At the age of 16, Rath was diagnosed with VHL disease, a rare genetic disorder which causes cancer cells to appear in various parts of the body. Since the diagnosis, he has researched and experimented with different ways of slowing down the growth of tumors in his kidneys, adrenal glands, pancreas, and spine.

In 2012, he took a sabbatical from his full-time position in Gallup to focus on writing a new book, titled Eat Move Sleep: How Small Choices Lead to Big Changes which became a New York Times bestseller upon its publication in October 2013. Eat Move Sleep was recognized as one of the best nonfiction books of 2013 by iTunes. It describes the impact of eating, moving, and sleeping on health and everyday energy offering practical ideas on how to make better health choices. The book emphasizes the interrelatedness of eating, moving, and sleeping encouraging that there be focus on all three activities in any health improvement program.

== Publications, a selection ==
- 2004 How Full Is Your Bucket? Positive Strategies for Work and Life, ISBN 978-1-59562-003-3
- 2006 Vital Friends: The People You Can't Afford to Live Without, ISBN 978-1-59562-007-1
- 2007 How Full Is Your Bucket? Positive Strategies for Work and Life. Educator's Edition, ISBN 978-1-59562-001-9
- 2007 StrengthsFinder 2.0, ISBN 978-1-59562-015-6
- 2009 How Full Is Your Bucket? For Kids, ISBN 978-1-59562-027-9
- 2009 Strengths Based Leadership: Great Leaders, Teams, and Why People Follow, ISBN 978-1-59562-025-5
- 2010 Wellbeing: The Five Essential Elements, ISBN 978-1-59562-040-8
- 2013 Eat Move Sleep: How Small Choices Lead to Big Changes, ISBN 978-1-939714-00-8
- 2020 Life's Great Question: Discover How You Contribute to the World, ISBN 978-1939714176
