= Gallup's List of Most Widely Admired People of the 20th Century =

US poll by the Gallup Organization

Gallup's List of People that Americans Most Widely Admired in the 20th Century is a poll published in December 1999 by The Gallup Organization to determine who around the world Americans admire most, in the 20th century.

Gallup has constructed a yearly Gallup's most admired man and woman poll list since 1948 but this poll covers the most notable figures of the entire century. They combined the results from the previous polls with a new preliminary poll to determine the 18 most admired people. The 1999 final poll produced an ordered list of 18 people, 12 of whom were males and 12 of whom were American citizens; the highest ranked non-American and non-male was (Saint) Mother Teresa, at #1.

As of 2026, at 80, Bill Clinton is the only surviving person on the list. At the time the list was published, Ronald Reagan, John Paul II, Margaret Thatcher, Nelson Mandela, and Billy Graham (the longest living person at 99) were all still living.

== List ==
List of winners of the Gallup's Most Widely Admired People of the 20th Century poll
Rank	Portrait	Name	Percentage	Ref.
1	Photographic portrait of Mother Teresa	Mother Teresa (1910–1997)	49%	
2		Martin Luther King Jr. (1929–1968)	34%	
3	Photographic portrait of John F. Kennedy	John F. Kennedy (1917–1963)	32%	
4	Photographic portrait of Albert Einstein	Albert Einstein (1879–1955)	31%	
5	Photographic portrait of Helen Keller	Helen Keller (1880–1968)	30%	
6	Photographic portrait of Franklin D. Roosevelt	Franklin D. Roosevelt (1882–1945)	26%	
7	Photographic portrait of Billy Graham	Billy Graham (1918–2018)	26%	
8	Photographic portrait of Pope John Paul II	Pope John Paul II (1920–2005)	25%	
9	Photographic portrait of Eleanor Roosevelt	Eleanor Roosevelt (1884–1962)	22%	
10	Photographic portrait of Winston Churchill	Winston Churchill (1874–1965)	20%	
11	Photographic portrait of Dwight D. Eisenhower	Dwight D. Eisenhower (1890–1969)	18%	
12	Photographic portrait of Jacqueline Kennedy	Jacqueline Kennedy Onassis (1929–1994)	18%	
13	Photographic portrait of Mahatma Gandhi	Mahatma Gandhi (1869–1948)	18%	
14	Photographic portrait of Nelson Mandela	Nelson Mandela (1918–2013)	17%	
15	Photographic portrait of Ronald Reagan	Ronald Reagan (1911–2004)	17%	
16	Photographic portrait of Henry Ford	Henry Ford (1863–1947)	15%	
17	Photographic portrait of Bill Clinton	Bill Clinton (b. 1946)	10%	
18	Photographic portrait of Margaret Thatcher	Margaret Thatcher (1925–2013)	9%	

== See also ==
- Gallup's most admired man and woman poll
