= Donald O. Clifton =

American psychologist

- Born: February 5, 1924; Butte, Nebraska, US
- Died: September 14, 2003 (aged 79); Lincoln, Nebraska, US
- Other name: Don
- Occupations: Chairman of Gallup, professor of educational psychology at University of Nebraska–Lincoln
- Known for: Gallup, CliftonStrengths
- Notable work: Now, Discover Your Strengths

Donald O. Clifton (February 5, 1924 – September 14, 2003) was an American psychologist, educator, author, researcher, and entrepreneur. He founded Selection Research, Inc., which later acquired Gallup Inc., where he became chairman, and developed CliftonStrengths, Gallup's online psychological assessment. Clifton was recognized with a presidential commendation from the American Psychological Association as "the father of strengths-based psychology and the grandfather of positive psychology".

== Early life and education ==
Clifton was born in Butte, Nebraska, in 1924. He attended University of Nebraska–Lincoln, earning a degree in mathematics and two in educational psychology. Later in life, Clifton received honorary doctorates in humane letters (1990) and laws (2001) from the University of Nebraska–Lincoln and Azusa Pacific University, respectively.

Clifton joined the United States Army Air Forces during World War II, where he earned the Distinguished Flying Cross.

== Career ==
Clifton taught and researched educational psychology at the University of Nebraska from 1950 to 1969. During this time, Clifton researched university tutors to study talent and what distinguished talented people from others.

According to Clifton, psychologists typically studied what was wrong with people, not why they excelled. He also identified that successful people had certain personal attributes that benefited them in their work. When Clifton left the university, he founded Selection Research Inc. (SRI) in Lincoln, Nebraska, helping private and public entities with employee selection. Clifton's firm SRI acquired Gallup in 1988 and Clifton became chairman.

Under Clifton, Gallup expanded beyond public opinion polls, entering the management consulting business. Gallup consulted with companies on ways to improve their businesses by homing in on their employees' strengths.

In 1999, Clifton created the online assessment tool Clifton StrengthsFinder that focuses on 34 themes that make up the user's personality. He co-authored the 2001 book Now, Discover Your Strengths with Marcus Buckingham, offering advice on determining employees' strengths and using those qualities for success at work. In 2007, the book was updated by Tom Rath and called StrengthsFinder 2.0, which is among Amazon's 20 bestselling books of all time. Gallup's books helped grow the company's consulting division's revenue from $2 million in 1998 to $50 million in 2001. In 2002, the American Psychological Association honored Clifton with a lifetime achievement award as "the father of strengths-based psychology and the grandfather of positive psychology".

After retiring as chairman of Gallup, Clifton was chairman of Gallup's International Research and Education Center and senior archivist of its World Leader Study.

Following his death, Gallup and the Clifton Foundation donated $30 million to the University of Nebraska–Lincoln to create the Don Clifton Strengths Institute, focusing on early identification and development of future entrepreneurs.

== Published works ==
- Soar with Your Strengths with Paula Nelson, ISBN 0-385-30414-5. Delacorte Press, 1992.
- Now, Discover Your Strengths with Marcus Buckingham, ISBN 0-7432-0114-0. Free Press, 2001.
- How Full Is Your Bucket? Positive Strategies for Work and Life with Tom Rath ISBN 1595620036. Gallup Press (2004)
- StrengthsQuest with Edward "Chip" Anderson
