= National United Methodist Church =

The National United Methodist Church
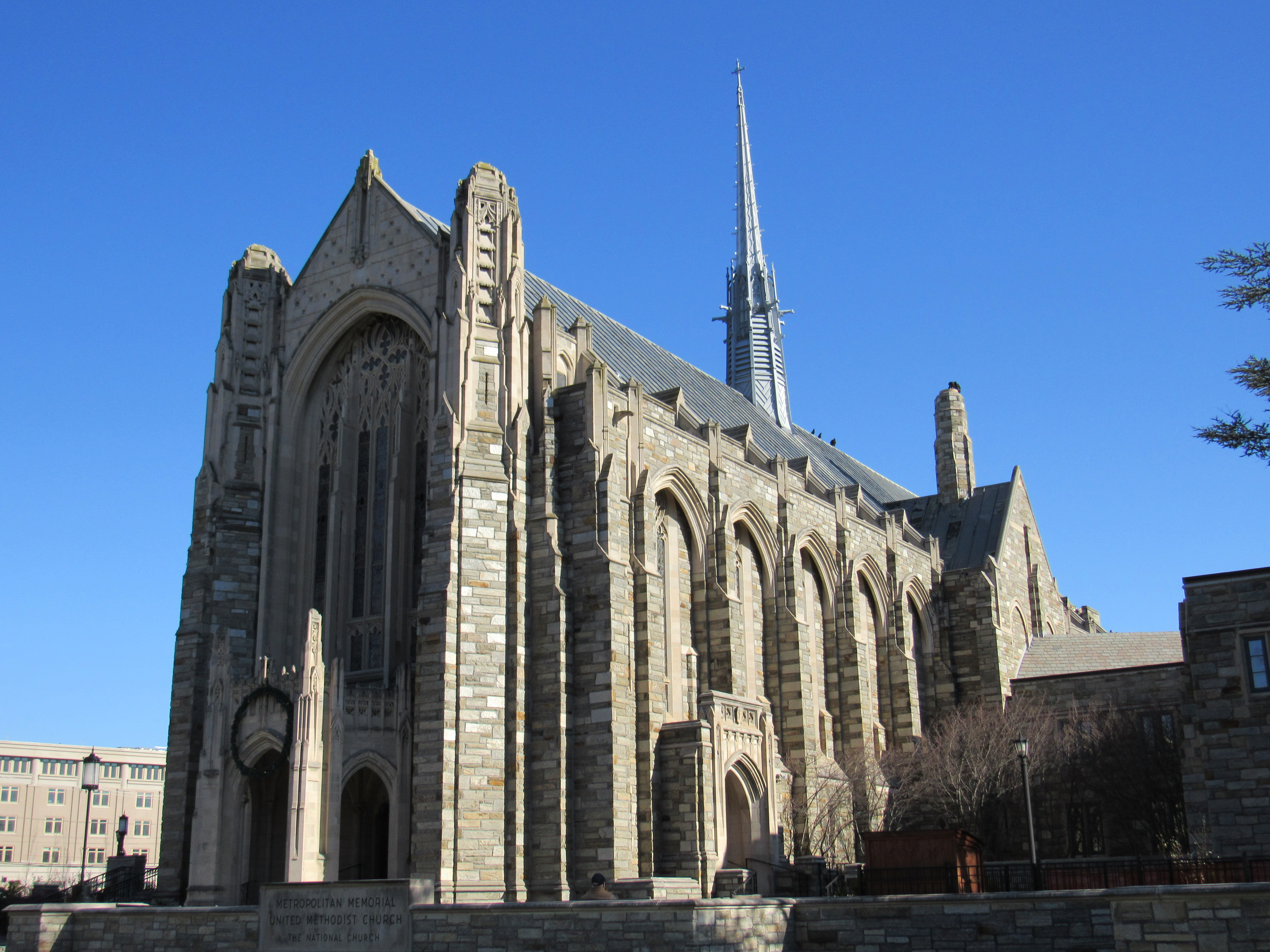
- Exterior view of the church from Nebraska Avenue
- The National United Methodist Church
- 38°56′06″N 77°05′16″W
- Location: 3401 Nebraska Ave NW; Washington, D.C.
- Country: United States
- Denomination: United Methodist Church
- Previous denomination: Methodist Church (USA) Methodist Episcopal Church
- Website: nationalchurch.org

History
- Former name: Metropolitan Memorial United Methodist Church
- Status: Active
- Founded: February 28, 1869
- Dedicated: February 7, 1932

Architecture
- Functional status: National church
- Architectural type: Church
- Style: Gothic revival

Clergy
- Bishop: LaTrelle Easterling
- Pastor(s): The Rev. Doug Robinson-Johnson, Rev. Janet Craswell, Rev. Dr. Rachel Livingston

The National United Methodist Church, formerly known as Metropolitan Memorial United Methodist Church, is a United Methodist congregation in the Wesley Heights neighborhood of Washington, D.C. Designated as the national church of the United Methodist Church, the building complex occupies a 6-acre campus adjoining the American University, comprising a church structure and administrative building. It includes a neo-Gothic main church, the fourth largest religious structure in the nation's capital.

== History ==
The church was founded in 1852 by a group of Methodists from the Washington, D.C. It was dedicated on February 28, 1869. On February 7, 1932, a new building was dedicated.

== Beliefs ==
=== Marriage ===
The church has an inclusive vision and celebrates both opposite-sex marriages and same-sex marriages.
