= Gallup, Inc. =

American analytics and advisory company

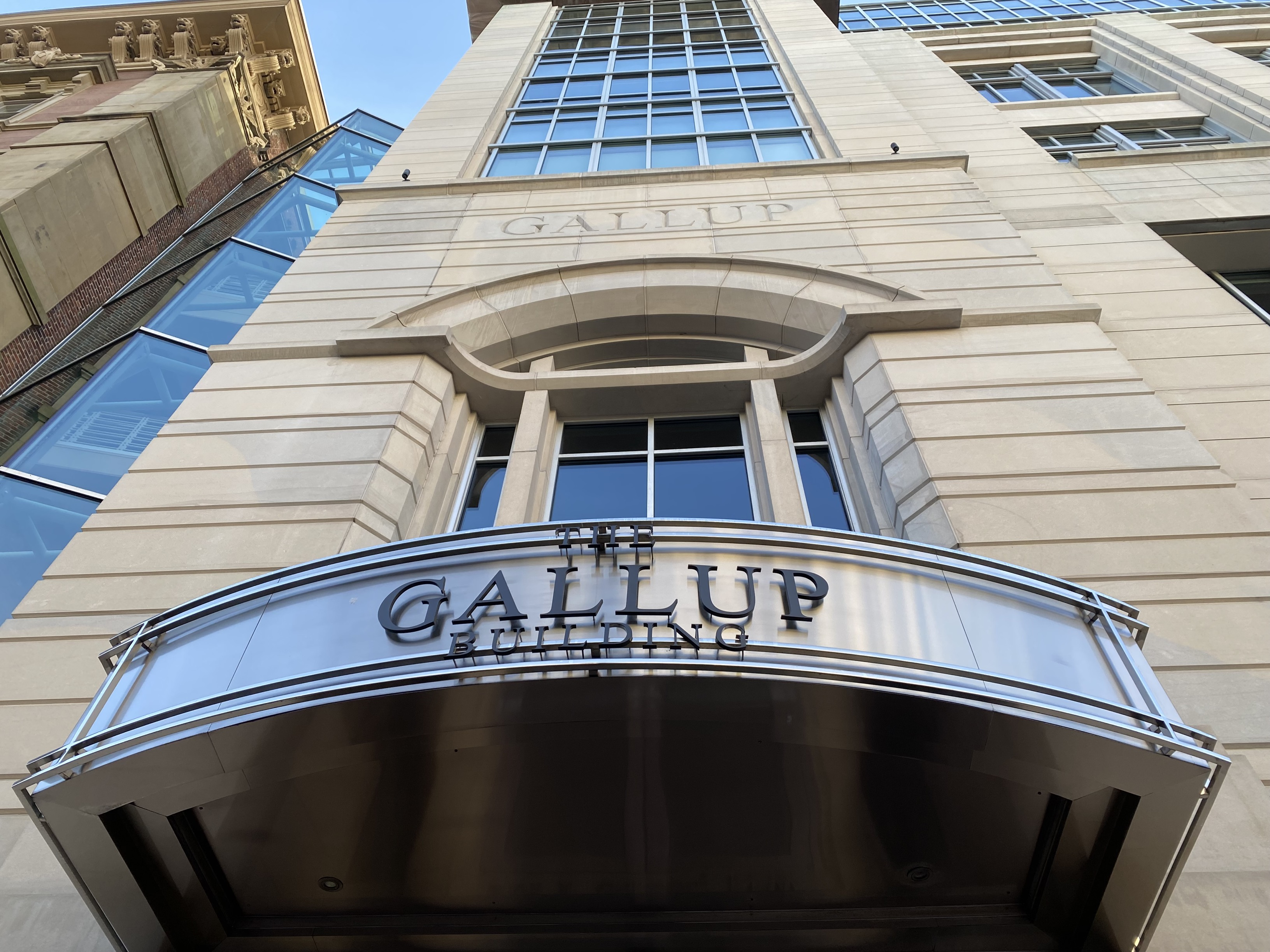
- Gallup Organization headquarters in Washington, D.C.
- Formerly: American Institute of Public Opinion; Gallup Organization
- Type: Private
- Industry: Management consulting
- Founded: 1935; 91 years ago in Princeton, New Jersey, U.S.
- Founder: George Gallup
- Headquarters: The Gallup Building, 901 F Street, NW, Washington, D.C., U.S.
- Number of locations: 30–40 offices globally (2017)
- Key people: Jon Clifton (CEO); Taek Lee (CFO)
- Services: Management consulting; Analytics; Research; Opinion polling; Publishing
- Owner: Employee-owned
- Website: www.gallup.com

Gallup, Inc. is an American multinational analytics and advisory company based in Washington, D.C. Founded by George Gallup in 1935, the company became known for conducting public opinion polls worldwide. Gallup provides analytics and management consulting to organizations globally. In addition, the company offers educational consulting, the CliftonStrengths assessment and associated products, and business and management books published by its Gallup Press unit.

== Organization ==
Gallup is a private employee-owned company based in Washington, D.C., founded by George Gallup in 1935. Headquartered in The Gallup Building, it maintains between 30 and 40 offices globally, in locations including New York City, London, Berlin, Sydney, Singapore, and Abu Dhabi, and has approximately 1,500 employees. In 2022, Jon Clifton became Gallup's CEO, replacing his father, Jim Clifton, who had been the CEO since 1998.

Gallup, Inc. has no affiliation with Gallup International, a Swiss-based polling organization founded by George Gallup in 1948. Gallup has sued Gallup International and other organizations for the unauthorized use of the Gallup name.

== History ==
=== 20th century ===
George Gallup (1901–1984) founded the American Institute of Public Opinion, the precursor of the Gallup Organization, in Princeton, New Jersey, in 1935. Gallup attempted to make his company's polls fair by sampling demographics representative of each state's voters. Gallup also refused to conduct surveys commissioned by organizations such as the Republican and Democratic parties, a position the company has continued to hold.

In 1935, George Gallup released his first political opinion poll. In March 1936, Time magazine wrote that Gallup polling data was "probably as accurate a sample of public sentiment as is available," which included U.S. presidential approval ratings. In 1936, Gallup successfully predicted that Franklin Roosevelt would defeat Alfred Landon for the U.S. presidency in direct contradiction to the popular The Literary Digest; this event popularized the company and made it a leader in American polling. In 1938, Gallup began conducting market research for advertising companies and the film industry.

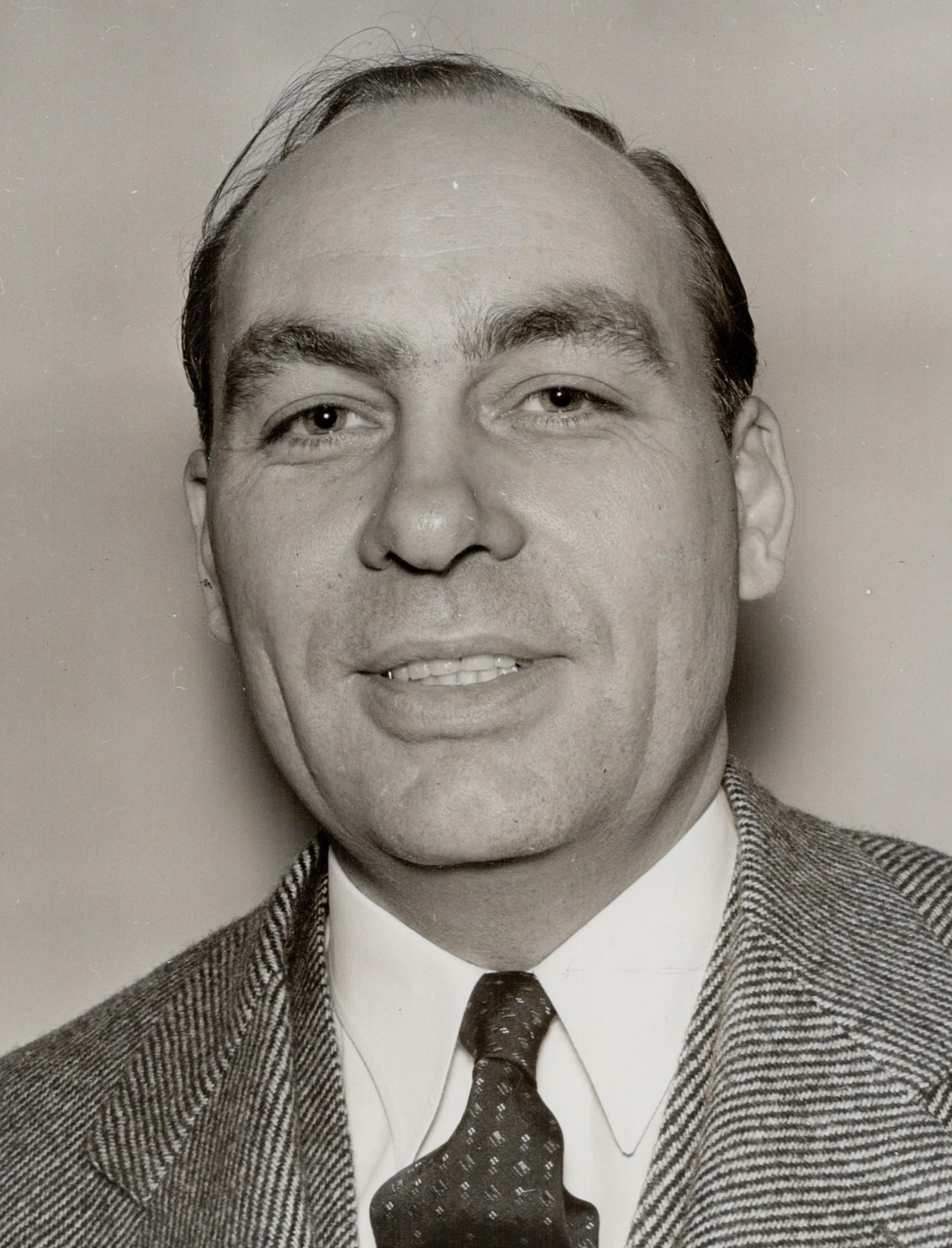
George Gallup, who founded the company in 1935 in Princeton, New Jersey

By 1948, Gallup's company established polling organizations in a dozen other countries, and Gallup's polls were syndicated in newspapers in the U.S. and abroad. The modern Gallup Organization was formed in 1958, when George Gallup merged all of his polling operations into one organization.

George Gallup died in 1984. Four years later, his family sold the firm for an undisclosed price to Selection Research, Incorporated (SRI), a research firm in Lincoln, Nebraska. The family's involvement with the business continued; sons George Gallup Jr. and Alec Gallup kept their positions as co-chairmen and directors. George Gallup Jr. (1930–2011) established the nonprofit George H. Gallup Foundation as part of the acquisition agreement. SRI, founded in 1969 by the psychologist Don Clifton and not to be confused with the more widely known Stanford Research Institute (also abbreviated SRI), focused on market research and personnel selection; it pioneered the use of talent-based structured psychological interviews.

Following its sale to SRI, Gallup repositioned itself as a research and management consulting company that works with businesses to identify and address issues with employees and their customers. Gallup continues to conduct and report on public polls.

In the 1990s, Gallup developed a set of 12 questions it called Q12 to help businesses gauge employee engagement, it entered partnerships to conduct polls for USA Today and CNN, and launched its Clifton StrengthsFinder online assessment tool.

In 1999, Gallup analysts wrote First, Break All the Rules, a bestselling book on management.

=== 21st century ===
In 2002, Fortune Small Business wrote that the success of First, Break All the Rules bolstered Gallup's consulting business.

In July 2013, the U.S. Department of Justice and Gallup reached a $10.5 million settlement based upon allegations that the company violated the False Claims Act and the Procurement Integrity Act. The complaint alleged that Gallup overstated its labor hours in proposals to the U.S. Mint and State Department for contracts and task orders to be awarded without competition. The Department of Justice alleged that the agencies awarded contracts and task orders at falsely inflated prices. The settlement also resolved allegations that Gallup engaged in improper employment negotiations with a then-Federal Emergency Management Agency (FEMA) official, Timothy Cannon, for work and funding. Michael Lindley, a former Gallup employee, originally made the allegations against Gallup under the False Claims Act. Lindley received nearly $2 million of the settlement. Under the settlement, there was no prosecution and no determination of liability.

In October 2015, Gallup decided to discontinue presidential election polling, also known as horse race polling, that measured which candidates were ahead, leading into the 2016 U.S. presidential election. Gallup officials said polling could still be accurate during the election, but the company decided to reallocate resources. Frank Newport, then Gallup's editor-in-chief, told The Washington Post that Gallup would instead conduct polls on "where the public stands on the issues of the day, how they are reacting to the proposals put forth by the candidates, what it is they want the candidates to do, and what messages or images of the candidates are seeping into the public's consciousness".

In February 2026, Gallup announced they would no longer measure presidential approval ratings or track the favorability of public figures. A spokesperson for the company said that approval ratings "are now widely produced, aggregated and interpreted, and no longer represent an area where Gallup can make its most distinctive contribution."

== Services ==
In addition to its Gallup Poll, which contributes a small part of the company's revenue, Gallup offers research and management consulting services, including the Q12 employee engagement survey, and CliftonStrengths. The Q12 employee engagement survey asks employees 12 questions about their workplace, coworkers, and management, to measure engagement and help managers and organizations improve productivity. CliftonStrengths (also known as StrengthsFinder) is an assessment that uses paired statements to measure a person's aptitudes in 34 strength categories, and produces a report outlining their top five strength areas and how to apply them. For K–12 education, Gallup consults and trains schools and school systems to focus on strengths and increase engagement. The company administers the Gallup Student Poll in the U.S., which measures success based on hope, engagement, and well-being.

== Gallup Poll ==
=== Polling in the United States ===
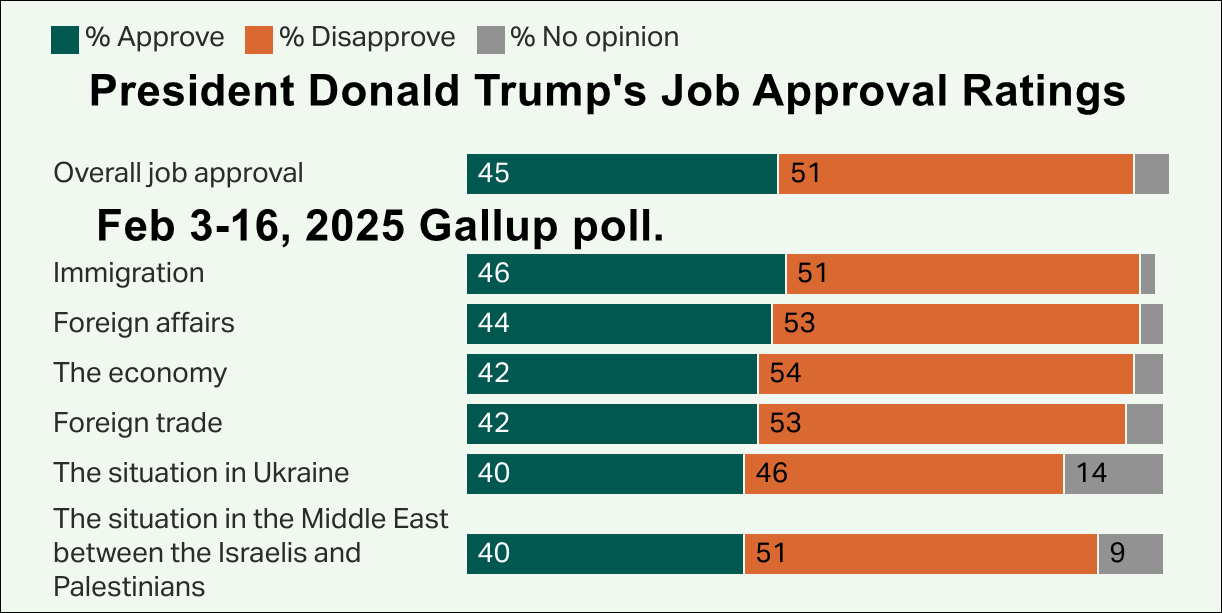
Gallup poll done Feb 3–16, 2025

Historically, the Gallup Poll has used opinion polling to measure and track the public's attitudes concerning political, social, and economic issues, including sensitive or controversial subjects. The Gallup Poll division's results, analysis, and videos are published daily in the form of data-driven news. As of 2012, conducting polls generated approximately $10 million in the company's yearly financial losses; however, it provides the Gallup brand name visibility, which helps promote its corporate research. In 2019, Mohamed Younis replaced Frank Newport as editor-in-chief to lead the Gallup News team.

==== Gallup Daily tracking methodology ====
Until 2018, Gallup Daily tracking had two surveys: the Gallup U.S. Daily political and economic survey and the Gallup–Healthways Well-Being Index. For both surveys, Gallup conducted 500 interviews across the U.S. per day, 350 days out of the year, with 70% on cellphones and 30% on landlines (with 34% of the nation relying on cell phones only in 2012. Gallup Daily tracking methodology relied on live interviewers, dual-frame random-digit-dial sampling (which included landline as well as cellular telephone phone sampling to reach those in cell phone-only households), and used a multi-call design to reach respondents not contacted on the initial attempt.

The findings from Gallup's U.S. surveys were based on the organization's standard national telephone samples, consisting of list-assisted random-digit-dial (RDD) telephone samples using a proportionate, stratified sampling design based on randomly generated phone numbers from all working phone exchanges (the first three numbers of a local phone number) plus unlisted phone numbers.

Within each contacted household reached via landline, an interview was sought with an adult 18 years of age or older living in the household who would have the next birthday. Because cell phone numbers are typically associated with one individual rather than shared among several members of a household, Gallup did not use the same selection procedure for cell phone interviews. Gallup Daily tracking included interviews in Alaska and Hawaii, and Spanish-language interviews.

When respondents to be interviewed were selected at random, every adult had an equal probability of falling into the sample. The typical sample size for a Gallup poll, either a traditional stand-alone poll or one night's interviewing from Gallup's Daily tracking, was 1,000 national adults, generating a margin of error of ±4 percentage points. Gallup's Daily tracking process allowed Gallup analysts to aggregate larger groups of interviews for more detailed subgroup analysis, but the accuracy of the estimates derived only marginally improved with larger sample sizes.

After Gallup collected and processed survey data, each respondent was assigned a weight so that the demographic characteristics of the total weighted sample of respondents matched the latest estimates of the demographic characteristics of the adult population available from the U.S. Census Bureau. Gallup weighted data to census estimates for gender, race, age, educational attainment, and region.

The data was weighted daily by number of adults in a household and the respondents' reliance on cell phones to adjust for any disproportion in selection probabilities. The data was then weighted to compensate for nonrandom nonresponse, using targets from the U.S. Census Bureau for age, region, gender, education, Hispanic ethnicity, and race. The resulting sample represented an estimated 95% of all U.S. households.

==== Accuracy ====
From 1936 to 2008, Gallup Polls correctly predicted the winner of the presidential election with the notable exceptions of the 1948 Thomas Dewey–Harry S. Truman election, where nearly all pollsters predicted a Dewey victory (which also led to the infamous Dewey Defeats Truman headline), and 1976, when they inaccurately projected a slim victory by Gerald Ford over Jimmy Carter. For the 2008 U.S. presidential election, Gallup correctly predicted the winner, but was rated 17th out of 23 polling organizations in terms of the precision of its pre-election polls relative to the final results.

In 2012, Gallup incorrectly predicted that Mitt Romney would win the 2012 U.S. presidential election. Gallup's final election survey had Mitt Romney at 49% and Barack Obama at 48%, compared to the final election results showing Obama with 51.1% to Romney's 47.2%. Poll analyst Nate Silver found that Gallup's results were the least accurate of the 23 major polling firms Silver analyzed, having the highest incorrect average of being 7.2 points away from the final result. Following the results of the election, Gallup spent six months reviewing its methodology. The company concluded that its methodology was flawed as it made too few phone calls in Eastern and Pacific time zones, overestimated the white vote, and relied on listed landline phones that skewed the sample to an older demographic.

Frank Newport, then editor-in-chief of Gallup, responded to the criticism by stating that Gallup simply makes an estimate of the national popular vote rather than predicting the winner, and that their final poll was within the statistical margin of error. Newport also criticized analysts such as Silver who aggregate and analyze other people's polls, stating that "It's much easier, cheaper, and mostly less risky to focus on aggregating and analyzing others' polls."

In 2012, poll analyst Mark Blumenthal criticized Gallup for a slight but routine under-weighting of black and Hispanic Americans that led to an approximately 2% shift of support away from Barack Obama. At the same time, Blumenthal commended Gallup for its "admirable commitment to transparency" and suggested that other polling firms disclose their raw data and methodologies.

In 2013, the accuracy of Gallup polling on religious faith was questioned. Gallup's polling on religiosity in the U.S. has produced results somewhat different from other studies on religious issues, including a 2012 study by the Pew Research Center, which found that those who lack a religious affiliation were a fast-growing demographic group in the U.S.

In 2016, The Wall Street Journal published a comparison of Gallup's survey-based measurement of unemployment with the same estimate from the U.S. Bureau of Labor Statistics (BLS) from 2010 to 2016. The numbers almost exactly match, and the trend is highly correlated, despite a larger sample size from the BLS, suggesting Gallup's design and weighting methods generate estimates consistent with government agencies.

=== Gallup World Poll ===
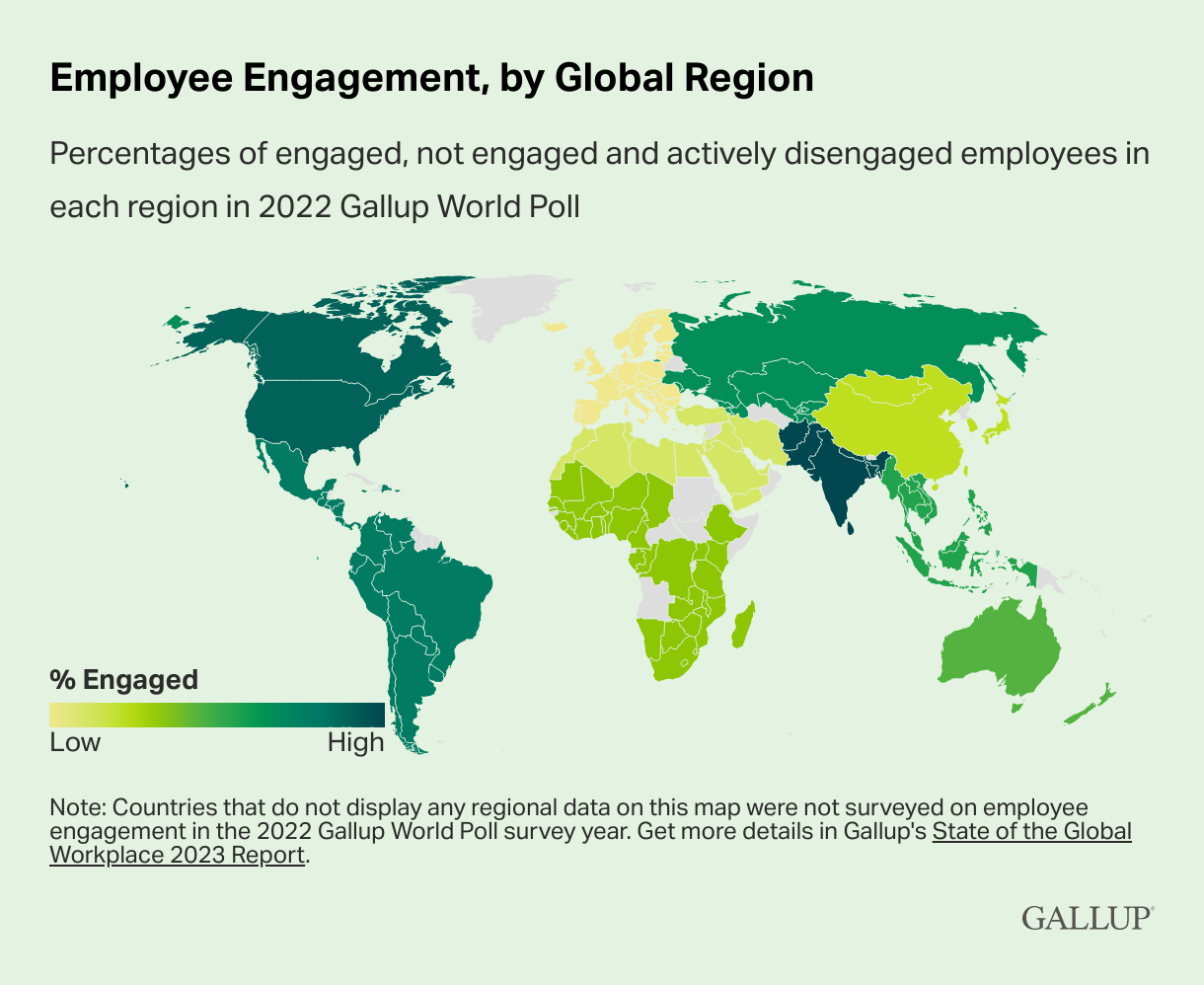
A Gallup opinion poll from 2023

In 2005, Gallup began its World Poll, which continually surveys citizens in 160 countries, representing more than 98% of the world's adult population. The Gallup World Poll consists of more than 100 global questions as well as region-specific items. It includes the following global indexes: law and order, food and shelter, institutions and infrastructure, good jobs, wellbeing, and brain gain. Gallup also works with organizations, cities, governments, and countries to create custom items and indexes to gather information on specific topics of interest.

Gallup additionally publishes other studies and results, such as its State of the Global Workplace report, Global Emotions report, and Rating World Leaders report.

==== Gallup World Poll methodology ====
Gallup interviews approximately 1,000 residents per country. The target population is the entire civilian, non-institutionalized population, aged 15 and older. Gallup asks each respondent the survey questions in their own language to produce statistically comparable results. Gallup uses telephone surveys in countries where telephone coverage represents at least 80% of the population. Where telephone penetration is less than 80%, Gallup uses face-to-face interviewing.

=== Surveys on China ===
Gallup is known for its public opinion surveys about China. Its latest survey, published in March 2023, stated that a record-low of 15% Americans have a favorable view of China, a metric it has been measuring since 1979.

In early November 2023, Gallup announced that it had closed all operations in China, a country that it first entered in 1993.

== Gallup's Exceptional Workplace Awards ==
For more than 15 years, Gallup has recognized organizations with the Gallup Exceptional Workplace Award. This award is reserved for organizations that meet standards set by the Q12 employee engagement survey, which includes analysis of more than 2.7 million workers across 100,000+ teams.

== Gallup Press ==
In 2015, Gallup's in-house publishing division, Gallup Press, had published approximately 30 books on business and personal well-being-related themes. Its most recent titles include It's the Manager, Wellbeing at Work, and Blind Spot. Other notable Gallup Press books include First, Break All the Rules and StrengthsFinder 2.0, which in 2017 was reported to be one of Amazon's 20 best-selling books of all time.

== See also ==
- Gallup's most admired man and woman poll
- Gallup's List of Most Widely Admired People of the 20th Century
- George H. Gallup House
- CliftonStrengths
